= Models of communication =

Simplified representations of communication

Many models of communication include the idea that a sender encodes a message and uses a channel to transmit it to a receiver. Noise may distort the message along the way. The receiver then decodes the message and gives some form of feedback.

Models of communication simplify or represent the process of communication. Most communication models try to describe both verbal and non-verbal communication and often understand it as an exchange of messages. Their function is to give a compact overview of the complex process of communication. This helps researchers formulate hypotheses, apply communication-related concepts to real-world cases, and test predictions. Despite their usefulness, many models are criticized based on the claim that they are too simple because they leave out essential aspects. The components and their interactions are usually presented in the form of a diagram. Some basic components and interactions reappear in many of the models. They include the idea that a sender encodes information in the form of a message and sends it to a receiver through a channel. The receiver needs to decode the message to understand the initial idea and provides some form of feedback. In both cases, noise may interfere and distort the message.

Models of communication are classified depending on their intended applications and on how they conceptualize the process. General models apply to all forms of communication while specialized models restrict themselves to specific forms, like mass communication. Linear transmission models understand communication as a one-way process in which a sender transmits an idea to a receiver. Interaction models include a feedback loop through which the receiver responds after getting the message. Transaction models see sending and responding as simultaneous activities. They hold that meaning is created in this process and does not exist prior to it. Constitutive and constructionist models stress that communication is a basic phenomenon responsible for how people understand and experience reality. Interpersonal models describe communicative exchanges with other people. They contrast with intrapersonal models, which discuss communication with oneself. Models of non-human communication describe communication among other species. Further types include encoding-decoding models, hypodermic models, and relational models.

The problem of communication was already discussed in Ancient Greece but the field of communication studies only developed into a separate research discipline in the middle of the 20th century. All early models were linear transmission models, like Lasswell's model, the Shannon–Weaver model, Gerbner's model, and Berlo's model. For many purposes, they were later replaced by interaction models, like Schramm's model. Beginning in the 1970s, transactional models of communication, like Barnlund's model, were proposed to overcome the limitations of interaction models. They constitute the origin of further developments in the form of constitutive models.

== Definition and function ==
Models of communication are representations of the process of communication. They try to provide a simple explanation of the process by highlighting its most basic characteristics and components. As simplified pictures, they only present the aspects that, according to the model's designer, are most central to communication. Communication can be defined as the transmission of ideas. General models of communication try to describe all of its forms, including verbal and non-verbal communication as well as visual, auditory, and olfactory forms. In the widest sense, communication is not restricted to humans but happens also among animals and between species. However, models of communication normally focus on human communication as the paradigmatic form. They usually involve some type of interaction between two or more parties in which messages are exchanged. The process as a whole is very complex, which is why models of communication only present the most salient features by showing how the main components operate and interact. They usually do so in the form of a simplified visualization and ignore some aspects for the sake of simplicity.

Some theorists, like Paul Cobley and Peter J. Schulz, distinguish models of communication from theories of communication. This is based on the idea that theories of communication try to provide a more abstract conceptual framework that is strong enough to accurately represent the underlying reality despite its complexity. Communication theorist Robert Craig sees the difference in the fact that models primarily represent communication while theories additionally explain it. According to Frank Dance, there is no one fully comprehensive model of communication since each one highlights only certain aspects and distorts others. For this reason, he suggests that a family of different models should be adopted.

Models of communication serve various functions. Their simplified presentation helps students and researchers identify the main steps of communication and apply communication-related concepts to real-world cases. The unified picture they provide makes it easier to describe and explain the observed phenomena. Models of communication can guide the formulation of hypotheses and predictions about how communicative processes will unfold and show how these processes can be measured. One of their goals is to show how to improve communication, for example, by avoiding distortions through noise or by discovering how societal and economic factors affect the quality of communication.

== Basic concepts ==
Many basic concepts reappear in the different models, like "sender", "receiver", "message", "channel", "signal", "encoding", "decoding", "noise", "feedback", and "context". Their exact meanings vary slightly from model to model and sometimes different terms are used for the same ideas. Simple models only rely on a few of these concepts while more complex models include many of them.

The sender is responsible for creating the message and sending it to the receiver. Some theorists use the terms source and destination instead. The message itself can be verbal or non-verbal and contains some form of information. The process of encoding translates the message into a signal that can be conveyed using a channel. The channel is the sensory route on which the signal travels. For example, expressing one's thoughts in a speech encodes them as sounds, which are transmitted using air as a channel. Decoding is the reverse process of encoding: it happens when the signal is translated back into a message.

Noise is any influence that interferes with the message reaching its destination. Some theorists distinguish environmental noise and semantic noise: environmental noise distorts the signal on its way to the receiver, whereas semantic noise occurs during encoding or decoding, for example, when an ambiguous word in the message is not interpreted by the receiver as it was meant by the sender. Feedback means that the receiver responds to the message by conveying some information back to the original sender. Context consists in the circumstances of the communication. It is a very wide term that can apply to the physical environment and the mental state of the communicators as well as the general social situation.

== Classifications ==
Models of communication are classified in many ways and the proposed classifications often overlap. Some models are general in the sense that they aim to describe all forms of communication. Others are specialized: they only apply to specific fields or areas. For example, models of mass communication are specialized models that do not aim to give a universal account of communication. Another contrast is between linear and non-linear models. Most early models of communication are linear models. They present communication as a unidirectional process in which messages flow from the communicator to the audience. Non-linear models, on the other hand, are multi-directional: messages are sent back and forth between participants. According to Uma Narula, linear models describe single acts of communication while non-linear models describe the whole process.

=== Linear transmission ===
Linear transmission model

Linear transmission models describe communication as a one-way process. In it, a sender intentionally conveys a message to a receiver. The reception of the message is the endpoint of this process. Since there is no feedback loop, the sender may not know whether the message reached its intended destination. Most early models were transmission models. Due to their linear nature, they are often too simple to capture the dynamic aspects of various forms of communication, such as regular face-to-face conversation. By focusing only on the sender, they leave out the audience's perspective. For example, listening usually does not just happen, but is an active process involving listening skills and interpretation. However, some forms of communication can be accurately described by them, such as many types of computer-mediated communication. This applies, for example, to text messaging, sending an email, posting a blog, or sharing something on social media. Some theorists, like Uma Narula, talk of "action models" instead of linear transmission models to stress how they only focus on the actions of the sender. Linear transmission models include Aristotle's, Lasswell's, Shannon-Weaver's and Berlo's model.

=== Interaction ===
Interaction model

For interaction models, the participants in communication alternate the positions of sender and receiver. So upon receiving a message, a new message is generated and returned to the original sender as a form of feedback. In this regard, communication is a two-way process. This adds more complexity to the model since the participants are both senders and receivers and they alternate between these two positions.

For interaction models, these steps happen one after the other: first, one message is sent and received, later another message is returned as feedback, etc. Such feedback loops make it possible for the sender to assess whether their message was received and had the intended effect or whether it was distorted by noise. For example, interaction models can be used to describe a conversation through instant messaging: the sender sends a message and then has to wait for the receiver to react. Another example is a question/answer session where one person asks a question and then waits for another person to answer. Interaction models usually put more emphasis on the interactive process and less on the technical problem of how the message is conveyed at each step. For this reason, more prominence is given to the context that shapes the exchange of messages. This includes the physical context, like the distance between the speakers, and the psychological context, which includes mental and emotional factors like stress and anxiety. Schramm's model is one of the earliest interaction models.

=== Transaction ===
Transaction model

Transaction models depart from interaction models in two ways. On the one hand, they understand sending and responding as simultaneous processes. This can be used to describe how listeners use non-verbal communication, like body posture and facial expressions, to give some form of feedback. This way, they can signal whether they agree with the message while the speaker is talking. This feedback may in turn influence the speaker's message while it is being produced. On the other hand, transactional models stress that meaning is created in the process of communication and does not exist prior to it. This is often combined with the claim that communication creates social realities like relationships, personal identities, and communities. This also affects the communicators themselves on various levels, such as their thoughts and feelings as well as their social identities.

Transaction models usually put more emphasis on contexts and how they shape the exchange of information. They are sometimes divided into social, relational, and cultural contexts. Social contexts include explicit and implicit rules about what form of message and feedback is acceptable. An example is that one should not interrupt people or that greetings should be returned. Relational contexts are more specific in that they concern the previous relationship and shared history of the communicators. This includes factors like whether the participants are friends, neighbors, co-workers, or rivals. The cultural context encompasses the social identities of the communicators, such as race, gender, nationality, sexual orientation, and social class. Barnlund's model is an influential early transaction model.

=== Constitutive and constructionist ===
Constitutive models hold that meaning is "reflexively constructed, maintained, or negotiated in the act of communicating". This means that communication is not just the exchange of pre-established bundles of information but a creative process, unlike the outlook found in many transmission models. According to Robert Craig, this implies that communication is a basic social phenomenon that cannot be explained through psychological, cultural, economic, or other factors. Instead, communication is to be seen as the cause of other social processes and not as their result. Constitutive models are closely related to constructionist models, which see communication as the basic process responsible for how people understand, represent, and experience reality. According to social constructionists, like George Herbert Mead, reality is not something wholly external but depends on how it is conceptualized, which happens through communication.

=== Interpersonal and intrapersonal ===
Model of intrapersonal communication by Larry L. Barker and Gordon Wiseman. The left side of the diagram shows the start of the process: external and internal stimuli (red and violet arrows) are perceived. This triggers various cognitive processes (green areas) involved in the interpretation of the stimuli. These processes result in the generation and transmission of new stimuli, which are again perceived.

Interpersonal communication is communication between two distinct persons, like when greeting someone on the street or making a phone call. Intrapersonal communication, in contrast, is communication with oneself. An example is a person thinking to themself that they should bring in the laundry from outside because it is about to rain. Most models of communication focus on interpersonal communication by assuming that sender and receiver are distinct persons. They often explore how the sender encodes a message, how this message is transmitted and possibly distorted, and how the receiver decodes and interprets the message.

However, some models are specifically formulated for intrapersonal communication. Many of them focus on the idea that intrapersonal communication starts with the perception of internal and external stimuli carrying information. These stimuli are processed and interpreted in various ways, for example, by classifying them and by ascribing symbolic meaning to them. Later steps include thinking about them, organizing information, and then encoding the ideas conceived this way in a behavioral response. This response can itself produce new stimuli and act as a form of feedback loop for continued intrapersonal communication. Some models of communication try to provide a perspective that includes both interpersonal and intrapersonal communication in order to show how these two phenomena influence each other.

=== Non-human ===
Steps of plant communication

The discipline of communication studies and the models of communication proposed in it are not restricted to human communication. They include discussions of communication among other species, like non-human animals and plants. Models of non-human communication usually stress the practical aspects of communication, ie., what effects it has on behavior. An example is that communication provides an evolutionary advantage to the communicators.

Some models of animal communication are similar to models of human communication in that they understand the process as an exchange of information. This exchange helps the communicators to reduce uncertainty and to act in a way that is beneficial to them. A further approach is discussed in the manipulative model of animal communication. It argues that the central aspect of communication does not consist in the exchange of information but in causing changes to the behavior of other organisms. This influence provides primarily a benefit to the sender and does not need to involve the transmission of messages. In this way, the sender "exploits another animal's ... muscle power". A slightly different approach focuses more on the cooperative aspect of communication and holds that both sender and receiver benefit from the exchange. Models of plant communication usually understand communication in terms of biochemical changes and responses. According to Richard Karban, this process starts with a cue that is emitted by a sender and then perceived by a receiver. The receiver processes this information to translate it into some kind of response.

=== Others ===
Additional classifications of communication models have been suggested. The term encoding-decoding model is used for any model that includes the phases of encoding and decoding in its description of communication. Such models stress that to send information, a code is necessary. A code is a sign system used to express ideas and interpret messages. Encoding-decoding models are sometimes contrasted with inferential models. For the latter, the receiver is not only interested in the information sent but tries to infer the sender's intention behind formulating the message.

Hypodermic models, also referred to as magic bullet theories, hold that communication can be reduced to the transfer of ideas, information, or feelings from a sender to a receiver. In them, the message is like a magic bullet that is shot by active senders at passive and defenseless receivers. They are closely related to linear transmission models and contrast with reception models, which ascribe an active role to the receiver in the process of communication and meaning-making.

Relational models stress the importance of the relationship between communicators. For example, Wilbur Schramm holds that this relationship informs the expectations the participants bring to the exchange and the roles they play in it. These roles influence how the communicators try to contribute to the communicative goal. In the context of instruction, for example, the teacher's role includes sharing and explaining information while the student's role involves learning and asking clarifying questions. Relational models also describe how communication affects the relationship between the communicators. For example, the communication between patient and hospital staff affects whether the patient feels cared for or dehumanized. Relational models are closely related to convergence models. For convergence models, the goal of communication is convergence: to reach a mutual understanding. Feedback plays a central role in this regard: effective feedback helps achieve this goal while ineffective feedback leads to divergence.

Difference models emphasize the role of gender and racial differences in the process of communication. Some posit, for example, that men and women have different communication styles and aim to achieve different goals through communication.

== History ==
Communication was studied as early as Ancient Greece and one of the first models of communication is due to Aristotle. However, the field of communication studies only developed in the 20th century into a separate research discipline. In its early stages, it often borrowed models and concepts from other disciplines, such as psychology, sociology, anthropology, and political science. But as it developed as a science, it started to rely more and more on its own models and concepts. Beginning in the 1940s and the following decades, many new models of communication were developed. Most of the early models were linear transmission models. For many purposes, they were replaced by non-linear models such as interaction, transaction, and convergence models.

=== Aristotle ===
One of the earliest models of communication was given by Aristotle. He speaks of communication in his treatise Rhetoric and characterizes it as a techne or an art. His model is primarily concerned with public speaking and is made up of five elements: the speaker, the message, the audience, the occasion, and the effect.

According to Aristotle's communication model, the speaker wishes to have an effect on the audience, such as persuading them of an opinion or a course of action. The same message may have very different effects depending on the audience and the occasion. For this reason, the speaker should take these factors into account and compose their message accordingly. Many of the basic elements of the Aristotelian model of communication are still found in contemporary models.

=== Lasswell ===
Visual presentation of Lasswell's model of communication as a linear transmission model.

Lasswell's model is an early and influential model of communication. It was proposed by Harold Lasswell in 1948 and uses five questions to identify and describe the main aspects of communication: "Who?", "Says What?", "In What Channel?", "To Whom?", and "With What Effect?". They correspond to five basic components involved in the communicative process: the sender, the message, the channel, the receiver, and the effect. For a newspaper headline, those five components are the reporter, the content of the headline, the newspaper itself, the reader, and the reader's response to the headline. Lasswell assigns a field of inquiry to each component, corresponding to control analysis, content analysis, media analysis, audience analysis, and effect analysis. The model is usually seen as a linear transmission model and was initially formulated specifically for mass communication, like radio, television, and newspapers. Nonetheless, it has been used in other fields, like new media. Many theorists treat it as a universal model applying to any form of communication. It is widely cited as a model of communication but some theorists, like Zachary S. Sapienza et al, have raised doubts about this characterization and see it instead as a questioning device, a formula, or a construct.

Lasswell's model is often criticized due to its simplicity. An example is that it does not include an explicit discussion of vital factors such as noise and feedback loops. It also does not talk about the influence of physical, emotional, social, and cultural contexts. These shortcomings have prompted some theorists to expand Lasswell's model. For example, Richard Braddock published an extension in 1958 including two additional questions: "Under What Circumstances?" and "For What Purpose?".

=== Shannon and Weaver ===
Shannon–Weaver model of communication

The Shannon–Weaver model is another early and influential model of communication. It is a linear transmission model that was published in 1948 and describes communication as the interaction of five basic components: a source, a transmitter, a channel, a receiver, and a destination. The source is responsible for generating the message. This message is translated by the transmitter into a signal, which is then sent using a channel. The receiver has the opposite function of the transmitter: it translates the signal back into a message, which is made available to the destination. The Shannon–Weaver model was initially formulated in analogy to how telephone calls work but is intended as a general model of all forms of communication. In the case of a landline phone call, the person calling is the source and their telephone is the transmitter translating the message into an electric signal. The wire acts as the channel. The person taking the call is the destination, and their telephone is the receiver.

Claude Shannon and Warren Weaver categorize and address problems relevant to models of communication at three basic levels: technical, semantic, and effectiveness problems. They correspond to the issues of how to transmit the symbols in the message to the receiver, how these symbols carry meaning, and how to ensure that the message has the intended effect on the receiver. Shannon and Weaver focus their attention on the technical level by discussing how noise can interfere with the signal. This makes it difficult for the receiver to reconstruct the source's intention found in the original message. They try to solve this problem by making the message redundant so that it is easier to detect distortions.

The Shannon–Weaver model has been influential in the fields of communication theory and information theory. However, it has been criticized because it simplifies some parts of the communicative process. For example, it presents communication as a one-way process and not as a dynamic interaction of messages going back and forth between both participants.

=== Newcomb ===
The basic components of Newcomb's model are two communicators (A and B) and a topic (X). The arrows symbolize the orientations the communicators have toward each other and toward the topic.

Newcomb's model was first published by Theodore M. Newcomb in his 1953 paper "An approach to the study of communicative acts". It is called the ABX model of communication since it understands communication in terms of three components: two parties (A and B) interacting with each other about a topic or object (X). A and B can be persons or groups, such as trade unions or nations. X can be any part of their shared environment like a specific thing or another person. The ABX model differs from earlier models by focusing on the social relation between the communicators in the form of the orientations or attitudes they have toward each other and toward the topic. The orientations can be favorable or unfavorable and include beliefs. They have a big impact on how communication unfolds. It is relevant, for example, whether A and B like each other and whether they have the same attitude towards X.

Newcomb understands communication as a "learned response to strain" caused by discrepancies between orientations. The social function of communication is to maintain equilibrium in the social system by keeping the different orientations in balance. In Newcomb's words, communication enables "two or more individuals to maintain simultaneous orientation to each other and towards objects of the external environment". The orientations of A and B are subject to change and influence each other. Significant discrepancies between them, such as divergent opinions on X, cause a strain in the relation. In such cases, communication aims to reduce the strain and restore balance through the exchange of information about the object. For example, if A and B are friends and X is someone both know, then equilibrium means that they have the same attitude towards X. However, there is a disequilibrium or strain if A likes X but B does not. This creates a tendency for A and B to exchange information about X until they arrive at a shared attitude. The more important X is to A and B, the more urgent this tendency is.

Westley and MacLean's expansion of Newcomb's model.

An influential expansion of Newcomb's model is due to Westley and MacLean. They introduce the idea of asymmetry of information: the sender (A) is aware of several topics (X_{1} to X_{3}) and has to compose the message (X') to communicate to the receiver (B). B's direct perception is limited to only a few of these topics (X_{1}B). Another addition is the inclusion of feedback (fBA) from the receiver to the sender. Westley and MacLean also propose a further expansion to account for mass communication. For this purpose, they include an additional component, C, that has the role of a gatekeeper filtering the original message for the mass audience.

=== Schramm ===
Schramm's model of communication differs from earlier models by including a feedback loop.

Schramm's model of communication is one of the earliest interaction models of communication. It was published by Wilbur Schramm in 1954 as a response to and an improvement over linear transmission models of communication, such as Lasswell's model and the Shannon–Weaver model. The main difference in this regard is that Schramm does not see the audience as passive recipients. Instead, he understands them as active participants that respond by sending their own message as a form of feedback. Feedback forms part of many types of communication and makes it easier for the participants to identify and resolve possible misunderstandings.

One requirement of successful communication is that the message is located in the overlap of the fields of experience of the participants.

For Schramm, communication is based on the relation between a source and a destination and consists in sharing ideas or information. For this to happen, the source has to encode their idea in symbolic form as a message. This message is sent to the destination using a channel, such as sound waves or ink on paper. The destination has to decode and interpret the message in order to reconstruct the original idea. The processes of encoding and decoding correspond to the roles of transmitter and receiver in the Shannon–Weaver model. According to Schramm, these processes are influenced by the fields of experience of each participant. A field of experience includes past life experiences and affects what the participant understands and is familiar with. Communication fails if the message is outside the receiver's field of experience. In this case, the receiver is unable to decode it and connect it to the sender's idea. Other sources of error are external noise or mistakes in the phases of decoding and encoding. Schramm holds that successful communication is about realizing an intended effect. He discusses the conditions for this to be possible. They include making sure that one has the receiver's attention, that the message is understandable, and that the audience is able and motivated to react to the message in the intended way.

In the 1970s, Schramm proposed modifications to his original model to take into account the discoveries made in communication studies in the preceding decades. His new approach gives special emphasis to the relation between the participants. The relation determines the goal of communication and the roles played by the participants.

=== Gerbner ===
George Gerbner first published his model in his 1956 paper Toward a General Model of Communication. It is a linear transmission model. It is based on the Shannon–Weaver model and Lasswell's model but expands them in various ways. It aims to provide a general account of all forms of communication. One of its innovations is that it starts not with a message or an idea but with an event. The communicating agent perceives it and composes a message about it.

For Gerbner, messages are not packages that exist prior to communication. Instead, the message is created in the process of encoding and is affected by the code and the channel. Gerbner assumes that the goal of communication is to inform another person about something they are unaware of. He includes a total of ten essential components: (1) someone (2) perceives an event (3) and reacts (4) in a situation (5) through some means. This is done with the goal of (6) making available materials (7) in some form (8) and context (9) conveying content (10) of some consequence. Each of these components corresponds to a different area of study. For example, communicator and audience research studies the first component while perception research is concerned with the second component. In Gerbner's example, "a man notices a house burning across the street and shouts 'Fire!'". In this case, "someone" corresponds to the man and the perceived event is the burning house. Other components include his voice (means) and the fire (conveyed content).

Gerbner's model of communication starts with the perception of an event. M is the communicator who formulates a message about this event. The message is then perceived and interpreted by the audience, labeled in the diagram as M₂.

The relation between message and reality is of central importance to Gerbner. For this reason, his model includes two dimensions. The horizontal dimension corresponds to the relation between communicator and event. The vertical dimension corresponds to the relation between communicator and message. Communication starts in the horizontal dimension with an event perceived by the sender. The next step happens in the vertical dimension, where the percept is translated into a signal containing the message. The message has two key aspects: content and form. The content is the information about the event. The last step belongs again to the horizontal dimension: the audience perceives and interprets the message about the event.

All these steps are creative processes that select some features to be included. For example, the event is never perceived in its entirety. Instead, the communicator has to select and interpret its most salient features. The same happens when encoding the message: the percept is usually too complex to be fully communicated and only its most significant aspects are expressed. Selection also concerns the choice of the code and channel to be used. The availability of a channel differs from person to person and from situation to situation. For example, many people do not have access to mass media, like television, to send their message to a wide audience. Gerbner's emphasis on the relation between message and reality has been influential for subsequent models of communication. However, Gerbner's model still suffers from many of the limitations of the earlier models it is based on. An example is the focus on the linear transmission of information without an in-depth discussion of the role of feedback loops. Another issue concerns the question of how meaning is created.

=== Berlo ===
Berlo's model includes a detailed discussion of the four main components of communication and their different aspects.

Berlo's model is a linear transmission model of communication. It was published by David Berlo in 1960 and was influenced by earlier models, such as the Shannon–Weaver model and Schramm's model. It is usually referred to as the Source-Message-Channel-Receiver (SMCR) model because of its four main components (source, message, channel, and receiver). Each of these components is characterized by various aspects and the main focus of the model is a detailed discussion of each of them. For Berlo, all forms of communication are attempts to influence the behavior of the receiver. To do so, the source has to express their purpose by encoding it into a message. This message is sent through a channel to the receiver, who has to decode it in order to understand it and react to it. Communication is successful if the reaction of the receiver matches the purpose of the source.

Berlo's main interest in discussing the components and their aspects is to analyze their impact on successful communication. Source and receiver are usually persons but can also be groups or institutions. On this level, Berlo identifies four features: communication skills, attitudes, knowledge, and social-cultural system. Communication skills are primarily the ability of the source to encode messages and the ability of the receiver to decode them. The attitude is the positive or negative stance that source and receiver have toward themselves, each other, and the discussed topic. Knowledge stands for the understanding of the topic and the social-cultural system includes background beliefs and social norms common in the culture and social context of the communicators. Generally speaking, the more source and receiver are alike in regard to these factors, the more likely successful communication is. Communication may fail, for example, if the receiver lacks the decoding skills necessary to understand the message or if the source has a demeaning attitude toward the receiver.

For the message, the main factors are code, content, and treatment, each of which can be analyzed in terms of its structure and its elements. The code is the sign system used to express the message, like a language. The content is the idea or information expressed in the message. Choosing an appropriate content and the right code to express it matters for successful communication. Berlo uses the term treatment to refer to this selection. It reflects the style of the source as a communicator. The channel is the medium and process of how the message is transmitted. Berlo analyzes it mainly based on the five senses used to decode messages: seeing, hearing, touching, smelling, and tasting. The SMCR model has inspired subsequent theorists. However, it is often criticized based on its simplicity because it does not discuss feedback loops and because it does not give enough emphasis on noise and other barriers to communication.

=== Dance ===
Dance's helical model understands communication in analogy to an upward-moving and widening helix.

Frank Dance's helical model of communication was initially published in his 1967 book Human Communication Theory. It is intended as a response to and an improvement over linear and circular models by stressing the dynamic nature of communication and how it changes the participants. Dance sees the fault of linear models as their attempt to understand communication as a linear flow of messages from a sender to a receiver. According to him, this fault is avoided by circular models, which include a feedback loop through which messages are exchanged back and forth. Dance criticizes the circular approach by holding that it "suggests that communication comes back, full circle, to exactly the same point from which it started".

Dance holds that a helix is a more adequate representation of the process of communication since it implies that there is always a forward movement. It shows how the content and structure of earlier communicative acts influence the content and structure of later communicative acts. In this regard, communication has a lasting effect on the communicators and evolves continuously as a process. The upward widening movement of the helix represents a form of optimism by seeing communication as a means of growth, learning, and improvement. The basic idea behind Dance's helical model of communication is also found in education theory in the spiral approach proposed by Jerome Bruner. Dance's model has been criticized based on the claim that it focuses only on some aspects of communication but does not provide a tool for detailed analysis.

=== Barnlund ===
Barnlund's model is an influential transactional model of communication first published in 1970. Its goal is to avoid the inaccuracies of earlier models and account for communication in all its complexity. This includes dismissing the idea that communication is defined as the transmission of ideas from a sender to a receiver. For Barnlund, communication "is the production of meaning, rather than the production of messages". He holds that the world and its objects lack meaning on their own. They are only meaningful to the extent that people interpret them and assign meaning to them by engaging in the processes of decoding and encoding. In doing so, people try to decrease uncertainty and arrive at a shared understanding.

Barnlund's model rests on a set of basic assumptions. For Barnlund, any activity that creates meaning is a form of communication. He sees communication as dynamic because meaning is not fixed but depends on the human practice of interpretation, which is itself subject to change. Communication is continuous in the sense that it does not have a beginning or an end: people decode cues and encode responses all the time, even when no one else is present. For Barnlund, communication is also circular because there is no clear division between sender and receiver as found in linear transmission models. It is irreversible due to the diverse effects it has on the communicators that cannot be undone. It is also complex since many components are involved and many factors influence how it unfolds. Because of its complexity, communication is unrepeatable: it is not possible to control all these factors to exactly repeat a previous exchange. This is not even the case when the same communicators exchange the same messages.

Barnlund's model is based on the idea that communication consists of decoding cues by ascribing meaning to them and encoding appropriate responses to them. Barnlund distinguishes between public, private, and behavioral cues. Public cues are accessible to anyone in the situation, such as a tree in a park or a table in a room. Private cues are only available to one person, like a coin in one's pocket or an itch on one's wrist. Behavioral cues are under the control of the communicators and constitute the main vehicles of communication. They include verbal behavior, like discussing a business proposal, and non-verbal behavior, like raising one's eyebrows or sitting down in a chair. Barnlund's model has been influential, both for its innovations and for its criticisms of earlier models. Some objections to it include that it is not equally useful for all forms of communication and that it does not explain how exactly meaning is produced.
