= Lasswell's model of communication =

Early influential model of communication

Visual presentation of Lasswell's model of communication as a linear transmission model.

Lasswell's model of communication is one of the first and most influential models of communication. It was initially published by Harold Lasswell in 1948 and analyzes communication in terms of five basic questions: "Who?", "Says What?", "In What Channel?", "To Whom?", and "With What Effect?". These questions pick out the five fundamental components of the communicative process: the sender, the message, the channel, the receiver, and the effect. Some theorists have raised doubts that the widely used characterization as a model of communication is correct and refer to it instead as "Lasswell's formula", "Lasswell's definition", or "Lasswell's construct". In the beginning, it was conceived specifically for the analysis of mass communication like radio, television, and newspapers. However, it has been applied to various other fields and many theorists understand it as a general model of communication.

Lasswell's model is still being used today and has influenced many subsequent communication theorists. Some of them expanded the model through additional questions like "Under What Circumstances?" and "For What Purpose?". Others used it as a starting point for the development of their own models.

Lasswell's model is often criticized for its simplicity. A common objection is that it does not explicitly discuss a feedback loop or the influence of context on the communicative process. Another criticism is that it does not take the effects of noise into account. However, not everyone agrees with these objections and it has been suggested that they apply mainly to how Lasswell's model was presented and interpreted by other theorists and not to Lasswell's original formulation.

== Concept and usage ==
Lasswell's model is one of the earliest and most influential models of communication. It was first published by Harold Lasswell in his 1948 essay The Structure and Function of Communication in Society. Its aim is to organize the "scientific study of the process of communication". It has been described as "a linear and Uni-directional process", "a one-way process", an "action model", a media theory "classic", a "widely used segmentation of the communication process", and "a simple, linear, and potentially hypodermic conceptualization of communication."

Lasswell's model analyzes communication in terms of five basic questions: "Who", "Says What", "In What Channel", "To Whom", and "With What Effect". These questions refer to the most salient components of the process of communication. Who asks about the person formulating the message and what is about the content of the message. The channel is the way the message is conveyed from the sender to the receiver. Whom refers to the recipient of the message. This can either be an individual or a bigger audience, as in the case of mass communication. The effect is the outcome of the communication, for example, that the audience was persuaded to accept the point of view expressed in the message. It can include effects that were not intended by the sender. In the case of a news paper headline, the sender is the reporter, the message is the content of the headline, the newspaper itself is the channel, the audience is the reader, and the effect is how the reader responds to the headline.

Lasswell assigns each question to its own field of inquiry within the discipline of communication studies, corresponding to control analysis, content analysis, media analysis, audience analysis, and effect analysis. Because of the centrality of its five questions, it is sometimes referred to as the 5W model of communication.

Question	Element	Analysis
Who?	Communicator	Control Analysis
Says What?	Message	Content Analysis
In Which Channel?	Medium	Media Analysis
To Whom?	Audience	Audience Analysis
With What Effect?	Effect	Effects Analysis

=== Alternative conceptions ===
Despite being widely seen as a model of communication, not everyone agrees that this is an accurate characterization. A model of communication is a simplified presentation that aims to give a basic explanation of the process by highlighting its most fundamental characteristics and components. For example, James Watson and Anne Hill see Lasswell's model as a mere questioning device and not as a full model of communication. In the early reception, the term "Lasswell's formula" was commonly used instead by scholars interested in describing and classifying acts of communication. However, many subsequent theorists rejected this terminology since the term "formula" seems to miss part of the significance and applications. Many comparisons with the Shannon–Weaver model invited the term "model" here as well. In this regard, it may be understood as a framework for conceptualizing communication. Some theorists use the term "Lasswell's formula" only for the question "Who, says what, in which channel, to whom, with what effect?" and not for the framework as a whole. Because it treats various basic concepts of communication, some scholars also refer to it as "Lasswell's definition" and some dictionaries even make reference to Lasswell in their definitions of communication. Zachary Sapienza et al. hold that there are many different conceptions of Lasswell's model, given both by himself and by other theorists. For this reason, they propose the term "Lasswell's construct" to emphasize that it is not one particular model but "an umbrella term which allows for multiple conceptions".

=== Usage ===
Lasswell's model was initially formulated specifically for the analysis of mass communication like radio, television, and newspapers. But it has also been applied to various other fields and forms of communication. They include the analysis of new media, such as the internet, computer animations, and video games. Lasswell's model is also utilized in pedagogical settings to teach students the major elements of the communication process and as a starting point for developing hypotheses. Lasswell and others have used his model beyond the scope of mass communication as a tool for the analysis of all forms of verbal communication. This is also reflected in the fact that some theorists employ his model in their definition of communication in general.

== Influence and developments ==
As one of the earliest models of communication, Lasswell's model has been very influential in the field of communication studies. In 1993, the communication scholars Denis McQuail and Sven Windahl referred to Lasswell's model as "perhaps the most famous single phrase in communication research." McQuail and Windahl also considered the model as a formula that would be transformed into a model once boxes were drawn around each element and arrows connected the elements.

The model's influence is also reflected in various expansions and developments. Many theorists have used it as a starting point for the development of their own theories. George Gerbner, the founder of the cultivation theory, expanded Lasswell's model in 1956 to focus "attention on perception and reaction by the perceiver and the consequences of the communication". Laswell's 5W model of communication was expanded by Richard Braddock into a 7W model in his 1958 paper "An Extension of Lasswell's Formula". It includes two additional questions: "Under What Circumstances?" and "For What Purpose?". The first question focuses on the importance of the context on communication. The second question emphasizes that there may be a difference between the sender's intention and the actual effect of the message. Similar extensions were proposed by Lennox Gray adding the question "in what situation?" and Herbert Hyman, who included the question "with what immediate response?". T. Duncan and S. Moriarty added a category for noise and focused on feedback instead of effect. According to media scholar Michael Real, not all such attempts are successful at capturing Lasswell's original intent. Lasswell himself also proposed additional questions, usually for the application of the model to specific fields. In the field of political communication, for example, he includes questions about what value outcomes are sought and whether the effect is in tune with the speaker's goals.

== Criticism ==
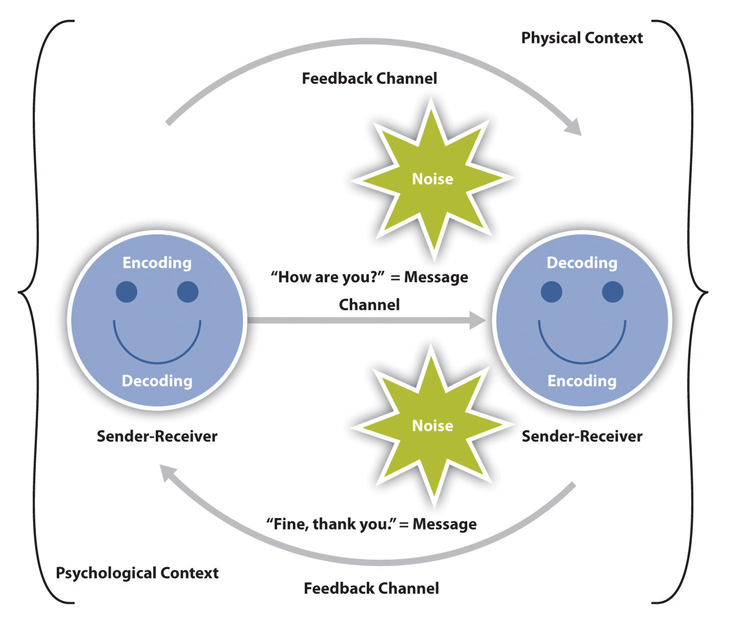
Lasswell's model has been criticized based on the claim that it does not address important factors like feedback and noise.

Most criticism of Lasswell's model focuses on its simplicity and lack of indepth discussion. For example, Greenberg and Salwen state: "Although Lasswell's model draws attention to several key elements in the mass communication process, it does no more than describe general areas of study. It does not link elements together with any specificity, and there is no notion of an active process." A common objection emphasizes its lack of a feedback loop. Feedback means that the receiver responds by sending their own message back to the original sender. This makes the process more complicated since each participant acts both as sender and receiver. For many forms of communication, feedback is of vital importance, for example, to assess the effect of the communication on the audience. However, it does not carry the same weight in the case of mass communication. Some theorists argue that this criticism is based on a misinterpretation of Lasswell's model. One reason for this view is that most models of communication take the form of graphical representation. And while there exist such visualizations for Lasswell's model, Lasswell never devised one himself and they are all due to other theorists interpreting his work. These visual representations usually show Lasswell's model as a linear transmission model lacking a feedback loop. Sapienza et al. argue against this view that Lasswell's model is not a linear transmission model since Lasswell also discusses two-way communication in another paper. Another argument in favor of this objection is that the effect discussed by Lasswell may be understood as some form of feedback.

Another shortcoming of Lasswell's model is that it does not take the effects of noise into account. Noise refers to influences that distort the message and make it more difficult for the receiver to reconstruct the source's original intention. For example, crackling sounds during a telephone call are one form of noise.

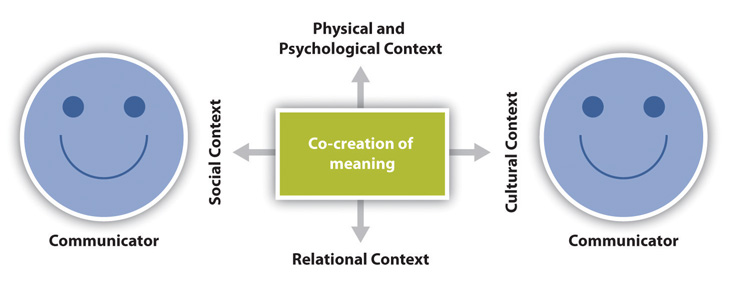
Another criticism points out that the influence of contexts is not included.

A further criticism focuses on the fact that Lasswell's model does not address various influences of the context on communication. Context is a wide term and refers to the circumstances of the transmission. There are various forms of context, like the physical surroundings, emotional aspects such as the mood of the participants as well as social and cultural factors. These factors are crucial in many cases for understanding why a conversation evolves one way rather than another.

The above-mentioned criticisms often lead to another objection: that Lasswell's model is outdated and therefore lacks usefulness in comparison to more modern models. However, despite being one of the oldest models of communication, Lasswell's model is still being used today. Such uses are often restricted to specific applications where the cited criticisms do not carry much weight. Examples include the analysis of mass media and new media.

Not everyone agrees with the criticisms listed above based on the simplicity of Lasswell's model. According to Sapienza et al., many of these objections result from an overly simplified presentation of Lasswell's model by subsequent theorists but do not apply to Lasswell's original formulation. Such simplifications may be motivated by the desire of the interpreter to emphasize the advances of their own models in comparison. Some theorists hold that Lasswell's model is too simple to be called a model of communication and is better characterized as a questioning device. Against this view, it has been argued that the model's simple presentation in terms of five questions is a convenient starting point but does not do justice to its theoretical complexity.

== See also ==
- Media effects
- Uses and gratifications theory
