= Sven Windahl =

Swedish professor of communication studies

- Born: May 1, 1942; Fristad outside Borås, Sweden
- Education: Lund University
- Scientific career
- Fields: Communication studies, organizational communication, sociology
- Workplaces: Lund University; Växjö University; University of Minnesota; University of Salzburg; ComCare; KAN Kommunikationsanalys; Nordisk Kommunikation

Sven Windahl (born May 1, 1942) is a Swedish professor of communication studies as well as a consultant in the field of organizational communication. His most influential work is the book Using Communication Theory from 1989, co-authored with Dr. Benno Signitzer and Jean T. Olson. The book has been translated into many languages.

== Early years ==
Windahl was born in Fristad outside Borås in Sweden. While in high school (gymnasium) in Borås he also worked as a journalist at the social democratic newspaper Västgöta-demokraten

== Education ==
He studied sociology at Lund University from 1963 to 1968, remaining at the university in an amanuensis position. In 1970, he became assistant professor at Växjö University (now Linnaeus University) where he helped start one of the first masters programmes in "information techniques" (now the Public Relations and Communication Programme) in Sweden. The programme focused on training people for information and communication work in the public sector, but as the programme continued, the private sector became an increasingly interested outlet.

While at Växjö University, he finished his doctoral thesis on the professionalization of journalism in Sweden.

== Career ==
While at the University of Minnesota in 1980-82 he worked with professor Jerry Kline on communication campaigns and also became editor and contributor of the peer-reviewed annual journal Mass Communication Review Yearbook.

In 1982, his book Communication Models was published - co-authored with Denis McQuail. The book details basic communication models (Lasswell model, Shannon and Weaver's model, Gerbner's model), theories of media, audience-centered models and mass media systems in general.

In 1986, he was visiting professor at the University of Salzburg, working with professor Benno Signitzer with whom he wrote the book Using Communication Theory: An Introduction to Planned Communication (published 1989). The book has been translated into among others French, Chinese, Greek, Italian, Japanese and Spanish.

His major research project between 1975 and 1987 was The Media Panel Program (MPP). The program is located at Lund University in Sweden and is a long-term research program focused on basic aspects of the mass media use by Swedish children, adolescents and young adults. The MPP was founded by professors Karl Erik Rosengren and Sven Windahl, and is acknowledged as being one of the most comprehensive of its kind. Publications stemming from the program include: Media matter: TV use in childhood and adolescence (KE Rosengren, S Windahl and B Dervin, JAI Press Limited 1989).

While still a professor at Växjö University he started the consultancy ComCare, serving the public and health-care sector. In 1985–1992, he was working as an advisor to the Swedish government task force on AIDS (AIDS delegationen) where he made a comparative study of AIDS prevention initiatives across European countries. While working with the health care sector he turned his focus to organizational communication and management communication. In 1991, he founded the consultancy Kommunikationsanalys AB.

In 1992, he became professor at Lund University, Department of Communication Studies and subsequently moved to Copenhagen. In 1993, he founded the consultancy Nordisk Kommunikation. It was during this period in the late 1990s that he introduced the notion of “communicative leadership”, focusing on the communication aspects of leadership in organisations.

In September 2017 he received an honorary doctorate from Roskilde University in recognition of his role as “a central researcher in the field of communication theory”.

== Selected articles ==
- Sven Windahl: "Uses and Gratifications at the Crossroads", Mass Communication Review Yearbook: Volume 2, 1981 - Sage Publications, Inc
- Rubin, Alan M.; Windahl, Sven (1986). "The uses and dependency model of mass communication". Critical Studies in Mass Communication. 3 (2): 184–199. doi:10.1080/15295039609366643.
- S Windahl, S Strohn: "Enculturation and Cultivation Analysis: Straddling the Fence?", Minneapolis School of Journalism and Mass Communication, University of Minnesota, 1982
- S Windahl - Högskolan i Växjö: "Mass Communication Models of the Future: Needs and Potentials", Informationsteknik. Lunds Universitet. Sociologiska Institutionen.
- Levy, Mark R.; Windahl, Sven (1984). "Audience Activity and Gratifications". Communication Research. 11: 51–78. doi:10.1177/009365084011001003.
- MR Levy, S Windahl, "The Concept of Audience Activity", Media gratifications research: Current perspectives, 1985
- Rubin, Alan M.; Windahl, Sven (1986). "The uses and dependency model of mass communication". Critical Studies in Mass Communication. 3 (2): 184–199. doi:10.1080/15295039609366643.
