= Receiver (information theory) =

The receiver in information theory is the receiving end of a communication channel. It receives decoded messages/information from the sender, who first encoded them. Sometimes the receiver is modeled so as to include the decoder. Real-world receivers like radio receivers or telephones can not be expected to receive as much information as predicted by the noisy channel coding theorem.

Real-world receivers include:

- For modulated radio waves, a radio receiver
  - For converting specifically AM modulated radio waves to sound, an AM Tuner
  - For converting specifically FM modulated radio waves to sound, an FM Tuner
  - For converting specifically television transmissions to video and audio, a television tuner, which may be a component of an AV receiver
- For modulated ultrasound waves, a receiver (modulated ultrasound)
- For converting analog electrical signals on a wire to audio, a speaker system, which may be a component of an audio headset or telephone handset.
- For reading magnetic patterns on tape, a tape head
- For reading magnetic patterns on a disk platter, the read head located on the disk read-and-write head
- For reading printed barcodes, a barcode reader.
