= Frank E. X. Dance =

- Born: November 9, 1929 (age 96); Brooklyn, New York, U.S.
- Education: Fordham University, Northwestern University
- Occupation: Professor of Communication
- Known for: Contributions to human communication theory
- Notable work: Speech Communication: Concepts and Behavior (1972) Human Communication Theory: Comparative Essays (1982)

Frank E. X. Dance (born November 9, 1929, Brooklyn) is an American communication professor. In 1994–1995, he was John Evans Professor at University of Denver.

== Life ==
He graduated from Fordham University and Northwestern University. He taught Speech Communication at the University of Wisconsin-Milwaukee until moving to Denver In the 1970’s.

== Legacy ==
A scholarship is named after him at University of Wisconsin.

== Works ==
- Frank E. X. Dance; Carl Everett Larson (1972). Speech Communication: Concepts and Behavior. Holt, Rinehart and Winston. ISBN 978-0-03-080088-7.
- Frank E. X. Dance; Carl E. Larson (1976). The Functions of Human Communication: A Theoretical Approach. Holt, Rinehart and Winston. ISBN 978-0-03-002026-1.
- Harold P. Zelko; Frank E. X. Dance (1978). Business and professional speech communication. Holt, Rinehart and Winston. ISBN 9780030188916.
- Frank E. X. Dance (January 1, 1982). Human Communication Theory: Comparative Essays. Harper & Row. ISBN 978-0-06-041481-8.
- Frank E X Dance (May 12, 2012). The Citizen Speaks: Speech Communication for Adults. Literary Licensing, LLC. ISBN 978-1-258-32997-6.
