= Communication noise =

Influences on the interpretation of conversations

Communication noise refers to influences on effective communication that influence the interpretation of conversations. Although often looked over, communication noise can have a profound impact on both our perception of interactions with others and our analysis of our own communication proficiency.

Forms of communication noise include psychological, physical, physiological, and semantic noise.

== Psychological noise ==
Psychological noise results from preconceived notions brought into conversations, such as stereotypes, reputations, biases, and assumptions. When we come into a conversation with ideas about what the other person is going to say and why, we can easily become blind to their original message. Most of the time, it is difficult to distance oneself from psychological noise, recognizing that it exists and taking those distractions into account when we converse with others is important. Psychological noise occurs when the psychological state of the receiver(s) is such as to produce an unpredictable decoding (right after a major earthquake, an "oldies" radio station in Los Angeles plays Elvis Presley's "I'm All Shook Up" as part of a preprogrammed music session and is condemned by listeners for mocking victims of the quake)(L Chirubvu, 2018)

Psychological noise can also include factors such as one’s current mood and interest in the conversation topic. For example, suppose the receiver has a general liking for the sender in the communication encounter. In that case, the receiver will be more successful in effectively listening to the sender’s message, and he or she will be able to respond effectively. Also, if the receiver is in either a bad or good mood, it will have an impact on how he or she receives the message. Although a positive emotion can increase the possibility of a successful communication encounter, it can also have a negative impact. It is crucial to recognize these emotions and analyze whether they are impacting the message transmission.

== Environmental noise ==
Environmental noise can be any external noise that can potentially impact the effectiveness of communication. These noises can be any type of sight (i.e., car accident, television show), sounds (i.e., talking, music, ringtones), or stimuli (i.e., tapping on the shoulder) that can distract someone from receiving the message. These noises can significantly impact the success of message transmission from the sender to the receiver. For example, two individuals at a party might have to speak louder to understand one another, and it might become frustrating. They are also very distracting, which will have a severe impact on one’s listening abilities - a crucial part of effective communication.

== Physical noise ==
Physical noise is any external or environmental stimulus that distracts us from receiving the intended message sent by a communicator (Rothwell 11). Examples of physical noise include: others talking in the background, background music, a startling noise and acknowledging someone outside of the conversation.

== Physiological noise ==
Physiological noise is any physical attribute that affects the way you communicate a message. When you experience physiological noise your body is causing your mind to lose focus on the message you're trying to receive. This results in a miscommunication of the message and in some cases a loss of the message completely. Some attributes of physiological noise are, lack of sleep, lack of eating or drinking, if you are sick, experiencing a headache, as well as some diagnosed disabilities; all of these examples occur inside your body. The Noise Control Act of 1972 was placed in order to oversee noise pollution in America because long-term exposure of physiological noise can have negative effects on the body.

== Semantic noise ==
This is noise that is often caused by the sender (also known as either the encoder or the source). This type of noise occurs when grammar or technical language is used that the receiver (the decoder) cannot understand, or cannot understand it clearly. It occurs when the sender of the message uses a word or a phrase that we don't know the meaning of, or which we use in a different way from the speakers. This is usually due to the result that the encoder had failed to practice audience analysis at first. The type of audience is the one that determine the jargon one will use.

== Communication Noise in Social Learning ==
Communication noise, involving errors and misunderstandings in information exchange, is traditionally seen as a hindrance in social learning. However, it can be beneficial in complex problem-solving scenarios by maintaining a diversity of perspectives and preventing premature convergence on a single solution. While this can enhance long-term problem-solving effectiveness in complex problems, it can reduce immediate learning efficiency and extend the problem-solving process in simpler problems. Understanding this dual impact of communication noise is vital in appreciating its role in collective intelligence and decision-making processes in group settings.
