= Shannon–Weaver model =

Linear model of communication

The five essential parts of the Shannon–Weaver model: A source uses a transmitter to translate a message into a signal, which is sent through a channel and translated back by a receiver until it reaches its destination.

The Shannon–Weaver model is one of the first models of communication. Initially published in the 1948 paper "A Mathematical Theory of Communication", it explains communication in terms of five basic components: a source, a transmitter, a channel, a receiver, and a destination. The source produces the original message. The transmitter translates the message into a signal, which is sent using a channel. The receiver translates the signal back into the original message and makes it available to the destination. For a landline phone call, the person calling is the source. They use the telephone as a transmitter, which produces an electric signal that is sent through the wire as a channel. The person receiving the call is the destination and their telephone is the receiver.

Shannon and Weaver distinguish three types of problems of communication: technical, semantic, and effectiveness problems. They focus on the technical level, which concerns the problem of how to use a signal to accurately reproduce a message from one location to another location. The difficulty in this regard is that noise may distort the signal. They discuss redundancy as a solution to this problem: if the original message is redundant then the distortions can be detected, which makes it possible to reconstruct the source's original intention.

The Shannon–Weaver model of communication has been influential in various fields, including communication theory and information theory. Many later theorists have built their own models on its insights. However, it is often criticized based on the claim that it oversimplifies communication. One common objection is that communication should not be understood as a one-way process but as a dynamic interaction of messages going back and forth between both participants. Another criticism rejects the idea that the message exists prior to the communication and argues instead that the encoding is itself a creative process that creates the content.

== Overview and basic components ==
The Shannon–Weaver model is one of the earliest models of communication. It was initially published by Claude Shannon in his 1948 paper "A Mathematical Theory of Communication". The model was further developed together with Warren Weaver in their co-authored 1949 book The Mathematical Theory of Communication. It aims to provide a formal representation of the basic elements and relations involved in the process of communication.

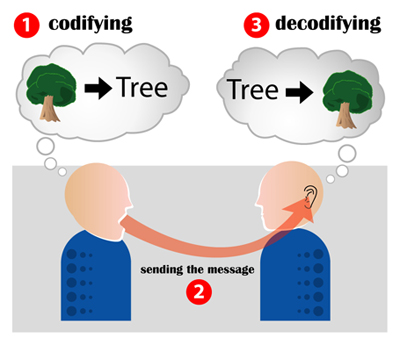
In successful face-to-face communication, a message is translated into a sound wave, which is transmitted through the air and translated back to the original message when it is heard by the other party.

The model consists of five basic components: a source, a transmitter, a channel, a receiver, and a destination. The source of information is usually a person and decides which message to send. The message can take various forms, such as a sequence of letters, sounds, or images. The transmitter is responsible for translating the message into a signal. To send the signal, a channel is required. Channels are ways of transmitting signals, like light, sound waves, radio waves, and electrical wires. The receiver performs the opposite function of the transmitter: it translates the signal back into a message and makes it available to the destination. The destination is the person for whom the message was intended.

Shannon and Weaver focus on telephonic conversation as the paradigmatic case of how messages are produced and transmitted through a channel. But their model is intended as a general model that can be applied to any form of communication. For a regular face-to-face conversation, the person talking is the source, the mouth is the transmitter, the air is the channel transmitting the sound waves, the listener is the destination, and the ear is the receiver. In the case of a landline phone call, the source is the person calling, the transmitter is their telephone, the channel is the wire, the receiver is another telephone and the destination is the person using the second telephone. To apply this model accurately to real-life cases, some of the components may have to be repeated. For the telephone call, for example, the mouth is also a transmitter before the telephone itself as a second transmitter.

== Problems of communication ==
Shannon and Weaver identify and address problems in the study of communication at three basic levels: technical, semantic, and effectiveness problems (referred to as levels A, B, and C). Shannon and Weaver hold that models of communication should provide good responses to all three problems, ideally by showing how to make communication more accurate and efficient. The prime focus of their model is the technical level, which concerns the issue of how to accurately reproduce a message from one location to another location. For this problem, it is not relevant what meaning the message carries. By contrast, it is only relevant that the message can be distinguished from different possible messages that could have been sent instead of it.

Semantic problems go beyond the symbols themselves and ask how they convey meaning. Shannon and Weaver assumed that the meaning is already contained in the message but many subsequent communication theorists have further problematized this point by including the influence of cultural factors and the context in their models. The effectiveness problem is based on the idea that the person sending the message has some goal in mind concerning how the person receiving the message is going to react. In this regard, effectivity means that the reaction matches the speaker's goal.The problem of effectivity concerns the question of how to achieve this. Many critics have rejected this aspect of Shannon and Weaver's theory since it seems to equate communication with manipulation or propaganda.

=== Noise and redundancy ===
To solve the technical problem at level A, it is necessary for the receiver to reconstruct the original message from the signal. However, various forms of noise can interfere and distort it. Noise is not intended by the source and makes it harder for the receiver to reconstruct the source's intention found in the original message. Crackling sounds during a telephone call or snow on a television screen are examples of noise. One way to solve this problem is to make the information in the message partially redundant. This way, distortions can often be identified and the original meaning can be reconstructed. A very basic form of redundancy is to repeat the same message several times. But redundancy can take various other forms as well. For example, the English language is redundant in the sense that many possible combinations of letters are meaningless. So the term "comming" does not have a distinct meaning. For this reason, it can be identified as a misspelling of the term "coming", thus revealing the source's original intention. Redundancy makes it easier to detect distortions but its drawback is that messages carry less information.

== Influence and criticism ==
The Shannon–Weaver model of communication has been influential, inspiring subsequent work in the field of communication studies. Erik Hollnagel and David D. Woods even characterize it as the "mother of all models." It has been widely adopted in various other fields, including information theory, organizational analysis, and psychology. Many later theorists expanded this model by including additional elements in order to take into account other aspects of communication. For example, Wilbur Schramm includes a feedback loop to understand communication as an interactive process and George Gerbner emphasizes the relation between communication and the reality to which the communication refers. Some of these models, like Gerbner's, are equally universal in that they apply to any form of communication. Others apply to more specific areas. For example, Lasswell's model and Westley and MacLean's model are specifically formulated for mass media. Shannon's concepts were also popularized in John Robinson Pierce's Symbols, Signals, and Noise, which introduces the topic to non-specialists.

Some theorists reject the linear nature of the Shannon–Weaver model and include a two-way exchange of messages instead.

Many criticisms of the Shannon–Weaver model focus on its simplicity by pointing out that it leaves out vital aspects of communication. In this regard, it has been characterized as "inappropriate for analyzing social processes" and as a "misleading misrepresentation of the nature of human communication". A common objection is based on the fact that it is a linear transmission model: it conceptualizes communication as a one-way process going from a source to a destination. Against this approach, it is argued that communication is usually more interactive with messages and feedback going back and forth between the participants. This approach is implemented by non-linear transmission models, also termed interaction models. They include Wilbur Schramm's model, Frank Dance's helical-spiral model, a circular model developed by Lee Thayer, and the "sawtooth" model due to Paul Watzlawick, Janet Beavin, and Don Jackson. These approaches emphasize the dynamic nature of communication by showing how the process evolves as a multi-directional exchange of messages.

Another criticism focuses on the fact that Shannon and Weaver understand the message as a form of preexisting information. I. A. Richards criticizes this approach for treating the message as a preestablished entity that is merely packaged by the transmitter and later unpackaged by the receiver. This outlook is characteristic of all transmission models. They contrast with constitutive models, which see meanings as "reflexively constructed, maintained, or negotiated in the act of communicating". Richards argues that the message does not exist before it is articulated. This means that the encoding is itself a creative process that creates the content. Before it, there is a need to articulate oneself but no precise pre-existing content. The communicative process may not just affect the meaning of the message but also the social identities of the communicators, which are established and modified in the ongoing communicative process.
