= Wilbur Schramm =

American scholar (1907–1987)

- Born: Wilbur Lang Schramm; August 5, 1907; Marietta, Ohio
- Died: December 27, 1987 (aged 80); Honolulu, Hawaii
- Education: B.A., Marietta College; M.A., Harvard University; Ph.D., University of Iowa
- Occupations: Journalist, writer, academic
- Writing career
- Language: English
- Notable works: Mass Media and National Development
- Notable awards: O. Henry Prize

Wilbur Lang Schramm (August 5, 1907 – December 27, 1987) was an American scholar and "authority on mass communications". He founded the Iowa Writers' Workshop in 1936 and served as its first director until 1941. Schramm was hugely influential in establishing communications as a field of study in the United States, and the establishing of departments of communication studies across U.S. universities. Wilbur Schramm is considered the founder of the field of Communication Studies. He was the first individual to identify himself as a communication scholar; he created the first academic degree-granting programs with communication in their name; and he trained the first generation of communication scholars. Schramm's mass communication program in the Iowa School of Journalism was a pilot project for the doctoral program and for the Institute of Communications Research, which he founded in 1947 at the University of Illinois at Urbana–Champaign, now housed in the UIUC College of Media. At Illinois, Wilbur Schramm set in motion the patterns of scholarly work in communication study that continue to this day.

== Early life and education ==
Schramm was born in Marietta, Ohio, to a musically inclined middle-class family whose ancestry hailed from Schrammburg, Germany. His father Arch Schramm played the violin, his mother Louise the piano, and Wilbur Schramm himself played the flute. His father was a lawyer in Marietta, Ohio. Due to their Teutonic name, his father's legal practice suffered. Wilbur Schramm "suffered from a stammer which at times severely hampered his speech, and which he never fully conquered". Schramm developed a severe stutter at age five due to an improperly performed tonsillectomy. Schramm's stutter was traumatic to him and he avoided speaking in public because of it. Instead of giving the valedictory address at his high school graduation, Schramm played the flute.

He graduated Phi Beta Kappa from Marietta College, where he received a bachelor's degree in political science while working as a reporter and editor at The Marietta Daily Herald. When he graduated summa cum laude from Marietta College in history and political science in 1929, he did give a valedictory speech. He received a master's degree in American civilization from Harvard University, where he worked as a reporter for The Boston Herald.

He left Harvard for Iowa in 1930 (mainly because of Lee Edward Travis's stammering clinic in Iowa City). In 1932, he received a Ph.D. in American literature from the University of Iowa where he studied under Norman Foerster and befriended Wallace Stegner. He wrote his dissertation on Henry Wadsworth Longfellow's epic poem, The Song of Hiawatha. Under a National Research Scholarship, he worked with renowned physiological psychologist Carl Seashore and completed a two-year postdoctoral course in psychology and sociology.

== Career ==
=== Early career (1930s) ===
In 1935 he was hired as an assistant professor in the University of Iowa's English department (and was promoted to associate professor in 1939, full professor in 1941). In 1935, he founded a literary magazine called American Prefaces: A Journal of Critical and Imaginative Writing, named so because it sought to "provide a place where young American writers could write the 'prefaces' to their careers." In 1936 he founded the Iowa Writers' Workshop.

His own stories resulted in his award of the O. Henry Prize for fiction in 1942 for his short story "Windwagon Smith." His interests extended beyond the humanistic tradition, and some of his early work examined the economic conditions surrounding the publication of Chaucer's tales, and audience reactions to poetry written in different meters.

The outbreak of World War II led Schramm to join the Office of War Information in 1941 to investigate the nature of propaganda; it was during this time when he began employing behaviorist methodologies.

=== Later career (1943–1975) ===
In 1943, Schramm returned to academia as director of the University of Iowa's School of Journalism. In 1947 he moved to the University of Illinois at Urbana–Champaign as director of the Institute of Communications Research, which he set up as a "flexible and non-territorial" organization unlike traditional academic departments.

In 1955 he moved to Stanford University to serve as founding director of the Institute for Communication Research until 1973. In 1961 he was appointed Janet M. Peck Professor of International Communication until he retired as professor emeritus in 1973. From 1959 to 1960 he served as a Fellow at the Center for Advanced Study in the Behavioral Sciences. From 1973 to 1975, Schramm served as Director of the East-West Center's Communication Institute in Honolulu, Hawaii, and later held the titles of director emeritus and Distinguished Senior Fellow.

In 1959, in an interview published by Canadian Press (CP) on February 3, Schramm stated that communications will become more personalized within the next 10 years and that "It is conceivable that you will be carrying around your own telephone within that time. Readers would be able to phone the news distribution center and say: 'Send me three columns of last night's hockey game and a full review of the Cuban situation.'"

== Later life ==
In 1977 Schramm settled in Honolulu, Hawaii, and was active at the Communication Institute at the East-West Center until he died on December 27, 1987, at 80 years old at his home. He was survived by his wife Elizabeth, daughter Mary Coberly, and a grandson.

== Development ==
His academic career took him around the world as he conducted research "evaluating mass communications in Asia and Africa, educational reform in El Salvador, television in American Samoa, the use of satellite broadcasting in India and the design of an open university in Israel".

Schramm was especially influential for his 1964 book Mass Media and National Development which was published in conjunction with UNESCO, which effectively began research into the link between the spread of communication technology and socioeconomic development.

In Mass Media and National Development (1964) Schramm said that mass media in developing countries needed to play three roles—those of watchdog, policy maker, and teacher for change and modernization.

== Works ==
He wrote 30 books.

His books include Mass Media in Modern Society (1949), Quality on Educational Television (1971), and Circulation of News in the Third World (1981). Before his death he completed The Story of Human Communication: Cave Painting to Microchip, which was published in 1988.

- Windwagon Smith and Other Yarns. New York: Harcourt, Brace & Company. 1947.
- Schramm, W. (Ed.). (1949). Mass Communications. Urbana, IL: University of Illinois Press.
- John W. Riley Jr. (1951). The Reds Take A City: The Communist Occupation of Seoul, with Eyewitness Accounts. New Jersey: Rutgers University Press.
- Siebert, F., Peterson, T. & Schramm, W. (1956). Four Theories of the Press. Urbana, IL: University of Illinois Press.
- Schramm, W. (Ed.). (1960). Mass Communications (2nd ed.). Urbana, IL: University of Illinois Press.
- Schramm, W. (1963). The Science of Human Communication. New York: Basic Books.
- Mass Media and National Development: The Role of Information in the Developing Countries. Stanford University Press. 1964. ISBN 978-0-8047-0227-0.
- Schramm, W. (1988). The Story of Human Communication: Cave Painting to Microchip. New York: Harper & Row.
- Schramm, W. (1997). The Beginnings of Communication Study in America: A Personal Memoir. Thousand Oaks, CA: Sage.
- Schramm, W., & Lerner, D. (Eds.). (1976). Communication and Change: The Last Ten Years and the Next. Honolulu, HI: University of Hawaii Press.
- Schramm, W., & Roberts, D. F. (Eds.). (1971). The Process and Effects of Mass Communication (Rev. ed.). Urbana, IL: University of Illinois Press.
- (Posthumous) Chaffee, Steven H.; Rogers, Everett M., eds. (1997). The Beginnings of Communication Study in America: A Personal Memoir. Thousand Oaks, CA: SAGE Publications. ISBN 978-0-7619-0716-9.

== Contributions ==
- Wilbur Schramm established the first academic units called "communication" at Illinois and then at Stanford.
- His most important product was undoubtedly the new Ph.D.s in communication who fanned out across the world after studying with Schramm at Stanford, to spread the concept of communication study.

== Bibliography ==
- Chaffee, S. H. (1988). In Memoriam: Wilbur Schramm, 1907–1987. The Public Opinion Quarterly, 52(3), 372–373.
- Chu, G. C. (1977). "Bibliography of the works of Wilbur Schramm." In D. Lerner & L. M. Nelson (Eds.), Communication Research: A Half-Century Appraisal (pp. 331–340). Honolulu, HI: University of Hawaii Press.
- Chu, G. C. (1989). Schramm, Wilbur (1907–1987). In E. Barnouw (Ed.), International encyclopedia of communication (Vol. 4, pp. 17–18). New York, NY: Oxford University Press.
- Rogers, E. M. (1994). A History of Communication Study: A Biographical Approach. New York: Free Press.
- Singhal, A. (1987). "Wilbur Schramm: Portrait of a development communication pioneer." Communicator: Journal of the Indian Institute of Mass Communication, 22(1–4), 18–22.
