= Verbal self-defense =

Verbal de-escalation technique

Verbal self-defense or verbal aikido is the art of using one's words to prevent, de-escalate, or end an attempted verbal or physical assault.

It is a way of using words to maintain mental and emotional safety. This kind of "conflict management" involves using posture and body language, tone of voice, and choice of words as a means for calming a potentially volatile situation before it can manifest into physical violence. This often involves techniques such as taking a time-out, deflecting the conversation to less argumentative topics, and/or redirecting the conversation to other individuals in the group who are less passionately involved.

== Overview ==
Verbal self-defense experts have widely varying definitions of what it is and how it is applied. These include everything from a person simply saying no to someone else or repeatedly refusing a request to telling someone who has violated a personal boundary what he/she ought to know. It could even entail a more complicated scenario in which a person is called on to refuse to engage verbally with someone manipulative, to set limits, and to end the conversation.

In any definition it is always agreed that verbal self-defense is necessary as a means of enforcing personal boundaries and limits. Part of learning these skills includes learning how to identify communication triggers which cause a person to experience negative feelings and, in some cases, what those triggers represent with regards to what personal values the other person are violating.

The abusive types of communication that verbal self-defense is designed to acknowledge and deal with also vary greatly. This includes indirect forms of abuse such as backhanded comments, and backstabbing or two-faced behaviors. As well, verbal self-defense is meant to address more commonly recognized forms of abuse such as yelling, belittling, and name calling. Going beyond verbal attacks, abusive behaviors also recognized in the field of verbal self-defense are aggressive posturing (taking a threatening posture or making a threatening gesture), physically interfering with personal belongings, and inappropriately intruding on one's personal space.

== Key components ==
Most experts who write and publish articles and books on the subject of verbal self-defense identify several key elements to strong verbal self-defense skills.

- Being able to identify people, situations, and/or behaviors that induce hurtful feelings – such as fear, inadequacy, and shame – is important in order to know when a person needs to apply verbal tactics of defense.
- Controlling how a person responds to conflict, both mentally and emotionally, is key to applying verbal defense skills efficiently and appropriately.
- Having a general knowledge of what to say in advance offers a significant advantage for anyone using verbal self-defense. Some authors have even gone so far as to provide actual statements for people to use as a way to deal with verbally aggressive communicators.

== Controversy ==
Authors and professional instructors offering seminars and workshops have differing views with regard to whether or not verbal self-defense is a form of "persuasion" and if "consequences" for the attacker should be considered a key component.

=== Persuasion vs. self-defense ===
In the field of verbal self-defense, the one element not entirely agreed upon is the concept that verbal defense tactics include the art of persuasion. Several authors clearly proclaim that verbal self-defense is designed as a means for persuading others; however, more recent books on the subject have denounced this commonly accepted fact.

The newer definition of verbal self-defense divides persuasion into a category of its own and states that verbal defense tactics should be more in line with the concept of physical self-defense. This idea, taken from ideologies of martial arts, puts forth the belief that verbal self-defense should only be used with respect to maintaining one's mental and emotional well-being. The position regarding self-protection in a verbal conflict and the further intention to protect the verbal assailant is posited in verbal aikido, which aims at proposing a balanced or collaborative result wherein the attacker may save face.

=== Consequences ===
The requirement for having a means to enforce "consequences" on people as a pre-requisite for effective verbal self-defense still remains questionable. Consequences are after effects that occur and can be positive or negative, but the word generally has a negative connotation along with punishment. Almost every author on the subject includes ways of handling non-physical aggression without having any repercussions for the attacker in the event the conflict is not solved amicably.

With specific regard to verbal self-defense in schools the concept of having consequences for bullying is considered by some to be key, where others are less focused on punishment and choose, instead, to put more emphasis on dealing with the aggressor in more positive ways. Although this topic has only recently begun being addressed by experts in this field it remains to be seen to what degree the importance of consequences will have in handling interpersonal conflicts using verbal self-defense.

== Common approaches ==
Leading authors in the area of verbal self-defense and defensive communication styles offer several different techniques for defusing potentially volatile and/or abusive situations of conflict.

=== Avoidance ===
Being aware of situations that will likely lead to verbal conflict or abuse and making an effort to avoid them.

=== Withdrawing ===
Once engaged in an argument, situation of conflict, or when being verbally attacked, making an excuse and exiting the area.

=== Deflecting ===
Changing topic or focus on the interaction as a means of avoiding any disagreement or negative reaction on the part of the aggressor.

=== Compromise ===
Openly offering ideas and seeking ways to placate the attacker and/or their reasons for the abusive communication.

=== Verbal aikido ===
A means of communication that is based on the aikido philosophy and martial way, created and propagated by Morihei Ueshiba during the 20th century. It is a style of conflict management and resolution that involves treating the "attacker" as a partner rather than an adversary. The techniques practiced by aikidoka aim at restoring a balanced interpersonal dynamic and/or reaching a positive emotional result in an exchange.

In a common teaching of this communication style, developed by Luke Archer, the approach is simplified into three steps:

1. Receiving the attack with an "inner smile" (a serene inner confidence)
2. Accompanying the attacker with verbal Irimi until destabilization
3. Proposing Ai-ki (an energy balance)

Through the methods and exercises taught in verbal aikido training, the practitioner works on developing a sense of self-control, an assertive style of communication, and the practice of deliberate intention.

== Applications ==
Verbal self-defense techniques are widely taught in police academies and have also been applied in workplaces, schools, public service environments, help desks and private security settings. Some educational and conflict-resolution program have incorporated these methods for adolescents, with proponents suggesting they may help participants manage interpersonal conflict and develop communication strategies aimed at de-escalation and personal safety.

== Influential contributors ==
Several people are considered to be significant contributors to the field of verbal self-defense. These include people who were early pioneers to advocate for the importance of verbal defense skills, developers of new techniques for verbally defensive tactics, and internationally recognized and known trainers.

- Suzette Haden Elgin (1936–2015), the author of The Gentle Art of Verbal Self-Defense, was one of the earliest writers to use the term. She states that verbal self-defense defends against the eight most common types of verbal violence, and redirect and defuse potential verbal confrontations.
- George Thompson (1941–2011), author of Verbal Judo, advanced the field of verbal self-defense by breaking down how to apply the techniques for de-escalation and defusing used by professionally trained police officers. He was one of the leading experts in verbal self-defense tactics and trained law-enforcement agencies around the world.
- Daniel Scott, author of Verbal Self Defense for The Workplace, more recently combined self-defense concepts with the language patterns of neuro linguistic programming in order to develop a new form of verbal self-defense. His new six-step model for verbal self-defense includes all the main components necessary for people to defend themselves against bullies and aggressive people in the work place and elsewhere.

== See also ==
- Assertiveness
- Conflict resolution
- Negotiations
- Persuasion
- Self-defense
- Verbal abuse
