= Victoria Nkong =

- Occupation: multilingual entertainment Consultant

Victoria Nkong is a Nigerian multilingual entertainment consultant and an event producer. She worked as a bi-lingual presenter, producer for Kora Awards, Headies Awards and she is currently the associate producer for AFRIMA AWARDS; she helped found a charity called the Life Fountain Orphanage Home. Victoria is the Executive Producer of Cruise & Chills boat cruise networking party for Business Moguls, Media and Celebrities: She is also behind Slum Invasion annual charity event. In 2017, Victoria was featured on "Women Rock Project".

== Life ==
Nkong was born into a family of educationists. Nkong obtained her first degree in modern languages from the University of Calabar in southern Nigeria and further studied business communication at the University of Cape Town in South Africa. she also studied Entrepreneurial Management at Lagos business school WomenX

Nkong worked with KORA All Africa Music Awards as bilingual presenter, served as PA to the KORA President and eventually became a show producer. in 2012. Between year 2011 to 2014 she organized international events like 50th anniversary of African Music with Akon, Vlisco Annual fashion show, MTN Yellow Summer in Benin Republic, International African Athletics Competition 2012.

Nkong helped to found a charity and the Life Fountain Orphanage Home.
