= Workplace communication =

Linguistic style for working

Workplace communication is the process of communicating and exchanging information (both verbal and non-verbal) between one person/group and another person/group within an organization. It includes e-mails, text messages, notes, calls, etc. Effective communication is critical in getting the job done, as well as building a sense of trust and increasing the productivity of employees. These may have different cultures and backgrounds, and can be used to different norms. To unite activities of all employees and restrain from any missed deadline or activity that could affect the company negatively, communication is crucial. Effective workplace communication ensures that all the organizational objectives are achieved. Workplace communication is tremendously important to organizations because it increases productivity and efficiency. Ineffective workplace communication leads to communication gaps between employees, which causes confusion, wastes time, and reduces productivity. Misunderstandings that cause friction between people can be avoided by effective workplace communication. Effective communication, also called open communication, prevents barriers from forming among individuals within companies that might impede progress in striving to reach a common goal. For businesses to function as desired, managers and lower-level employees must be able to interact clearly and effectively with each other through verbal communication and non-verbal communication to achieve specific business goals. Effective communication with clients plays a vital role in development of an organization and success of any business. When communicating, nonverbal communication must also be taken into consideration. How a person delivers a message has a lot of influence on the meaning of this one.

Another important aspect to have effective workplace communication is taking into consideration the different backgrounds of employees. "While diversity enriches the environment, it can also cause communication barriers." Difficulties arise when a coworker's cultural background leads him or her to think differently than another. It is for this reason that knowing about intercultural communication at work and learning how to treat others without offending them can bring several benefits to the company.

== Method of communication ==
Different people absorb information in different ways. To make sure that the information conveyed is understood by all, the method used for communication must be simple, clear, and precise. When presenting vital information, using pictures will make way for easy understanding. The presence of trust inside a corporation will also simplify the use of communication. Relationships must be established between coworkers to create a tension-free workplace. Messages should be sent and received with no alterations. To achieve healthy relationships in the workplace, behaviors such as bullying, taking credit for someone else's work and free riding should be avoided. These will create toxic relationships that will, in the long run, impact negatively a company and the productivity. Furthermore, recent studies have shown that fostering a culture of trust within an organization enhances communication effectiveness and promotes a collaborative environment. Preferring two-way communication is considered best for communicating. Adequate importance can be given for discussion, questions and clarifications.

== Content ==
The content of the information plays a major role in workplace communication. The level of detail must be according to the grasping capacity of the audience. Giving too much detail may get the audience bored and too little detail won't make them involved. Use of jargon while communicating is not considered good for effective workplace communication.

== Frequency ==
While formal workplace communication that is done too rarely or too often is not good for an organization, frequent informal workplace communication has its benefits. A perfect balance is required for the proper functioning of an organization. Information must be communicated as and when required rather than holding unnecessary meetings frequently. At the same time crucial information must not be held till the last hour or day, instead they must be communicated early to engage employees in the objectives of the organization.

== Skills ==
Getting the message across efficiently depends on the skills of the communicator such as presentation skills, group facilitation skills, negotiation and written communication skills. Successful communication also depends upon the capacity of the employees to understand the information. This requires providing the employees some basic financial literacy like financial statements, sales, profitability, etc.

When selecting a candidate, most employers seek for those who have strong speaking and writing skills. Problem solving and self- motivation are also highly necessary skills among the workplace. These allow rapidly changing environments to become less of a challenge.

== Tools ==
With the fast evolution of technology, companies have to stay up to date with communication tools that facilitate the workplace communication. Some of these include email, blogs, instant messaging and even social media sites such as Twitter and Facebook. It is important to keep in mind that sending an email, a fax or a letter does not necessarily mean that communication has taken place. Only when a message has been sent, received and understood by the intended receiver, it can be said that communication has occurred.

== Effective communication of bad news ==
Bad news communication involves delivering unfavorable information to parties who are both internal and external to the organization. Effective communication must be clear, understandable, maintain trust and reduce the anxiety associated with the negative news

=== Approaches to offering bad news ===
Depending on the situation, audience, and your role there are two approaches to communicate bad news.

==== Direct approach ====
In this approach, the negative news is communicated immediately. It is suitable when there is a large audience to reduce misinterpretations.

==== Indirect approach ====
In this approach, the bad news is communicated in a structured way which could soften strong negative reactions and maintain good relationship. It involves four steps they are,

1.Buffer

Start the communication with a supportive tone and a statement of appreciation to neutral and positive environment.

2.Reason

Give the reason behind the bad news so that the audience understands it and accept it.

3.Bad news

A clear and understandable statement of the bad news which may include alternatives and compromises.

4.Polite ending

End the conversation with a personalized and forward-looking pleasant statement to redirect the impact of bad news.

== Barriers ==
Common barriers to effective communication at workplace:

- Physical barriers: Physical structure, location and construction of the workplace acts as a barrier to effective communication. Employees seated remotely from each other hinders effective interaction.
- Language barriers: Employees with different native languages will be working in an organization. As everyone in organization are not comfortable with native language of the other person, language acts as a barrier for effective workplace communication. Language barriers, such as differences in slang or register among second language speakers, within a workplace can create issues impeding proper work task completion.
- Cultural barriers: Employees from different cultures, following different practices will be working in an organization. This cultural diversity among the employees can act as barrier for effective communication at workplace. The workplace significantly influences working women's language use, with solidarity and professionalism being key factors driving changes in their language across different settings.
- Emotional barriers: Emotional barriers like fear, inferiority, shyness, lack of self confidence and skills will stop an employee in communicating effectively with his colleagues.
- Perception barriers: Employees will have different experiences, values, preferences and attitudes. These may lead to a variety of assumptions and can act as a communication barrier.

== See also ==
- Business communication
- Intercultural communication
- Communication
