= Defensive communication =

Type of communication between people

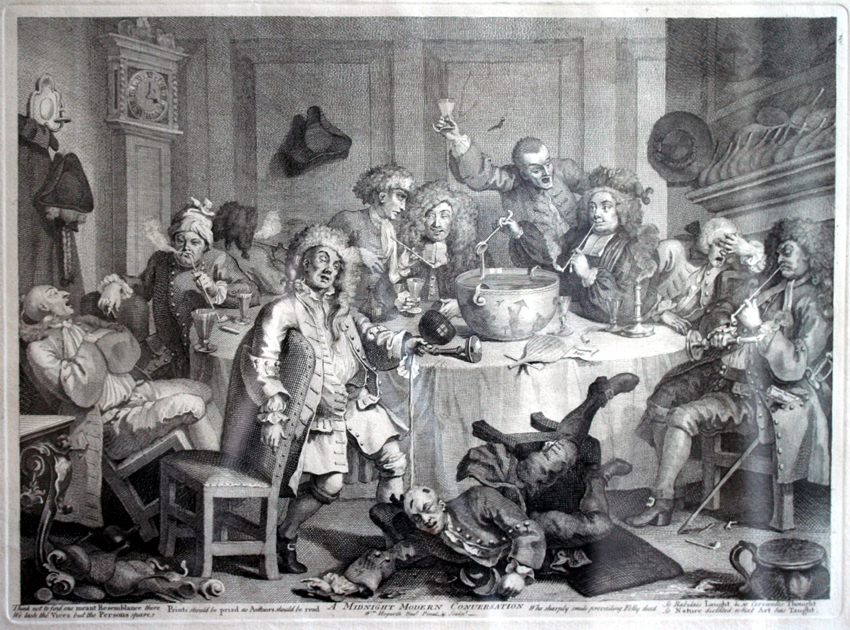
Defensive communication leads to the degrading of discourse in a group.

Defensive communication is a communicative behavior that occurs within relationships, work environments, and social groups when an individual reacts in a defensive manner in response to a self-perceived flaw or a threat from outsiders. Defensive responses can be triggered by external events and by feelings of anxiety, insecurity, and sensitivity, and often occurs in circumstances where people feel negatively evaluated, controlled, or persuaded by others. Sigmund Freud was one of the first scientists to research the subject of defensive communication in depth, during his development of psychodynamic theory. Defensiveness creates inefficient and damaging communication in social interactions when people deny their flaws, project their flaws on others, or use judgmental communication techniques.

== History ==
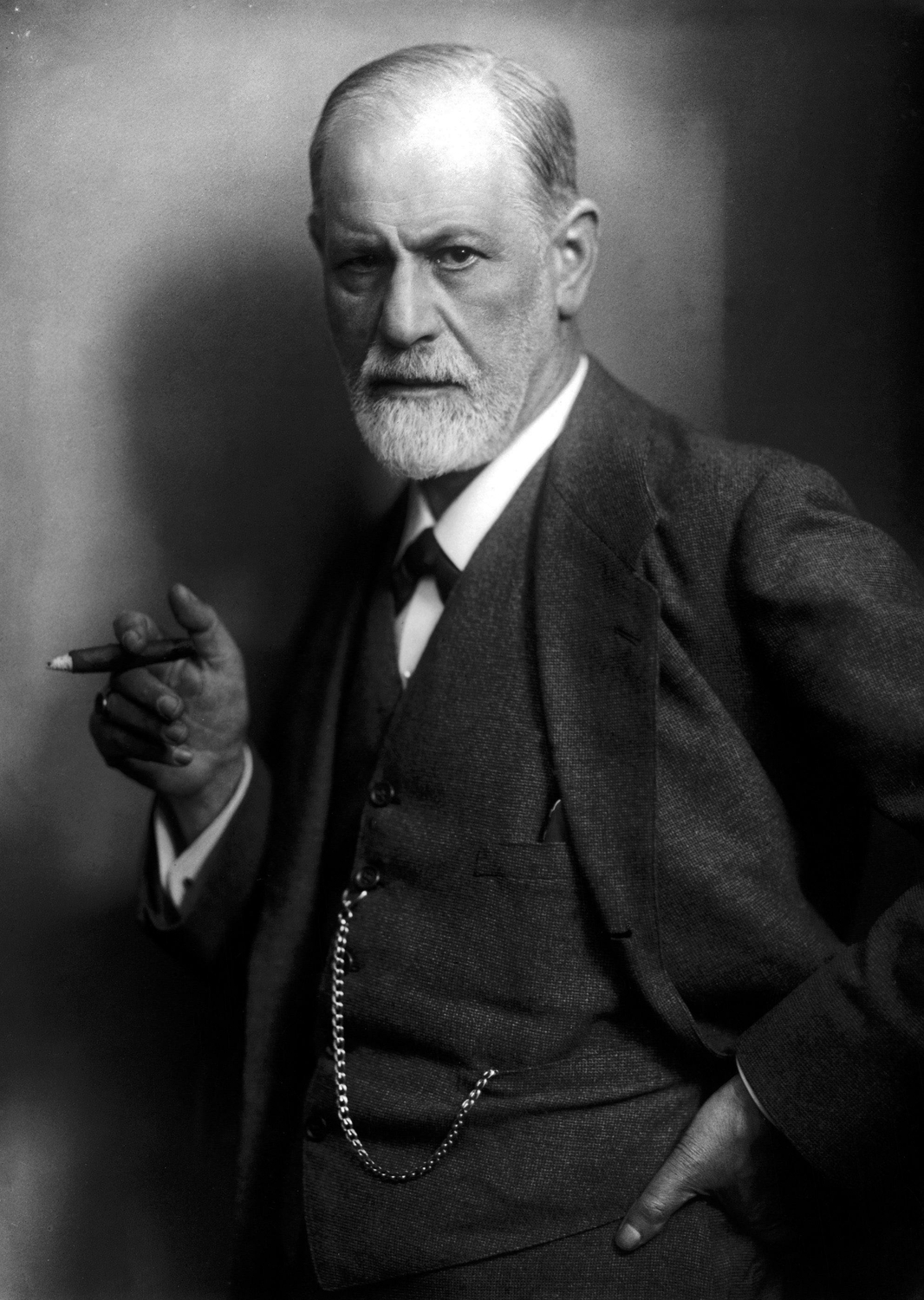
Sigmund Freud

Psychodynamic Theory

Psychodynamics is the study of the psychological forces that underlie human behavior. Sigmund Freud's work on psychodynamic theory was the foundation of research into defensive communication. Freud and his colleagues believed that internal emotions such as anxiety, guilt, and insecurities created defensive reactionary behaviors. Psychodynamic theorists also believe defensiveness is a reactionary response to protect oneself from external threats.

Gibb's supportive and defensive communication theory

The theory states that defensive behaviors occur when an individual feels threatened during communication and feel necessary to defend themselves. Jack Gibb was considered one of the first scholars to examine specific communication behaviors [9]. Certain defensive communication conversations may seem normal but on the inside of the individual they are angry and threatened [9].

Defensive Climate Conceptualization

In 1961, Gibb developed a conceptual framework for categorizing communication into defensive and supportive behaviors. The defensive behaviors include evaluation, control, strategy, neutrality, superiority, and certainty. The supportive behaviors, in contrast, include description, problem orientation, spontaneity, empathy, equality, and provisionalism. Individuals respond either defensively or in a supportive manner based on their own perceptions of the communicative climates. For example, communication perceived as evaluative will increase defensiveness in the listener, due to the perception that the communicator is judging the listener. Descriptive communication, such as requests for information that are perceived to be genuine, does not initiate the same defensive response.

== Defensiveness in social interaction ==
Defensive communication in social interaction is hypothesized to be related to a self-perceived flaw, attacks from others, or a focus on an attack on flaws of others. In this hypothesis, which combines insights from psychodynamics and Gibb's defensive climate conceptualization, defensive reactions can be triggered by either internal and external forces. Internally, perceptions of sensitive internal flaws such as personality traits can trigger defensive responses. Externally, defensive communication occurs when people perceive an attack or other threat. Defensive communication is a relational construct (a subjective worldview) that arises as a result of internal individual perceptions.

== Applications ==
Defensiveness in the Workplace

Defensive communication is common in the workplace due to the environment frequently being perceived as evaluative, judgmental, manipulative, or autocratic. Research indicates defensive reactions in the workplace cause inefficiency in communication and potential burnout. Much of the communication in a workplace is between managers and subordinates, increasing the need for efficient and supportive communication strategies.

Defensive communication in the workplace can be caused depending on who the leader is and burnout. Burnout is a reoccurring situation that contains to happen in every workplace [1]. Defensive communication leads to higher numbers of burnout. Leaders in workplaces have an important role in creating a community with coworkers.

Defensiveness in Romantic Relationships

Romantic relationships create four contextual conditions for defensive communication: self-perceptions of flaws, situational difficulties, emotional difficulties, and relational concerns. Research shows that people are sensitive not only about their own perceived flaws, but also about the flaws of those close to them. Emotion can also intensify perception of flaws and threats from others. Jealousy, anxiety, and uncertainty can also elicit defensive communication behavior, and lack of supportive communication, lack of communicative warmth, lack of communicative sharing, and lack of attentiveness are all triggers of defensive communication. Defensive communication in relationships can be damaging and can lead to increased arguments, uncertainty, and stress.

Defensiveness in Family Environments

Defensive communication can occur in family environments and can consist of verbal and nonverbal behaviors that are threatening and/or punishing to others. This type of communication will frequently invite defensive behaviors in return. Behavior like this will promote a "defensive climate" as defined by Gibb. Children raised in atmospheres with high defensiveness and low amounts of supportive communication tend to develop aggressive behaviors. Defensiveness in parenting is caused when parents feel threatened when their kid speaks up on their emotions in certain situations. communication in parenting can have an impact on discrepancy and dyadic adjustment in the kids [10].

== Critique ==
A central criticism of defensive communication is the lack of empirical research supporting Gibb's initial paper on the topic. Gibb's paper on the climate conceptualization of defensiveness was not a scientific study and did not allow other researchers to replicate or test his hypothesis.
