= Quill (application) =

- Developer: Quill
- Release: February 23, 2021; 5 years ago
- Platform: MacOS, Windows, Linux, Android, iOS, and Web
- Available in: English
- Type: Business communication

Quill was a premium business communication application that was officially released on February 23, 2021, having previously been in beta. Quill was created as an alternative to Slack and was available on MacOS, Windows, Linux, Android, iOS, and the Web.

The company received $2 million funding from venture-capitalist Sam Altman and General Catalyst, and also received $12.5 million in Series A funding, which valued Quill at $62.5 million, led by Index Ventures partner and former Slack board observer Sarah Cannon. Quill was headquartered in San Francisco, California.

Quill was acquired by Twitter in December 2021 and the service was shut down on December 11, 2021.
