= Interdepartmental communication =

Interdepartmental communication is largely a formal affair between different departments of an organization. Interdepartmental communication is effective when it is supported by good infrastructural facilities. There are various documents used in inter departmental communication, they are:

- A memorandum is a note or record for future use. It is convenient and useful for informal communication. Most interdepartmental communication is done over phone, but when the information has to be communicated in writing then memorandums are used. Memos are also issued in the cases of disciplinary actions to be taken against employees. The format of a memo is almost the same.
- Office circulars are used to convey the information to a large number of employees. It is used for internal communication, so it is brief and formal.
- The format of office orders is similar to memorandum but the purpose for which it is issued will differ. It is usually issued in matters affecting rights and privileges of employees. Office orders carry a number since they will be in force until revoked.
- Suggestions are given by employees. Sometimes they given by one department to another. It helps in developing new ideas and policies. But its effectiveness depends on the attitude of the management.
- Complaints are a part of office routine. As the size of the organization increases, the number of complaints also increases. In many cases complaints may relate to lack of proper infrastructure, non-observance of rules, etc.

== See also ==
- Organizational communication
- Office administration
