= Strategic talk =

Strategic talk is how language can be used to maximize shared understanding by consciously and deliberalty to formulating talk, asking questions and giving answers, putting other's talk into our own words, using concrete example and telling stories to illustrate a meaning. This method of organizational or business communication was created by Richard E. Heymen Ed.D.
