= Physical Quality of Life Index =

Measure of a country's quality of life

The Physical Quality of Life Index (PQLI) is an attempt to measure the quality of life or well-being of a country. The value is the average of three statistics: basic literacy rate, infant mortality, and life expectancy at age one, all equally weighted on a 1 to 100 scale.

It was developed for the Overseas Development Council in the mid-1970s by M.D Morris, as one of a number of measures created due to dissatisfaction with the use of GNP as an indicator of development. He thought that they would cover a wide range of indicators like health, sanitation, drinking water, nutrition, education etc. PQLI might be regarded as an improvement but shares the general problems of measuring quality of life in a quantitative way. It has also been criticized because there is a considerable overlap between infant mortality and life expectancy.

The UN Human Development Index is a more widely used means of measuring well-being.

Steps to Calculate Physical Quality of Life:

1. Find percentage of the population that is literate (literacy rate).
2. Find the infant mortality rate. (out of 1000 births)
  INDEXED Infant Mortality Rate = (166 - infant mortality) × 0.625
3. Find the Life Expectancy.
  INDEXED Life Expectancy = (Life expectancy - 42) × 2.7
4. Calculate Physical Quality of Life
  Physical Quality of Life equals the average of Literacy Rate, INDEXED Infant Mortality Rate and INDEXED Life Expectancy.

Increase in national income and per capita income are not the real indicators of economic development, as it has a number of limitations. Increasing incomes of the country are concentrated in the hands of a few people, which is not development. The development of a country should be such that the living standards of the poor rises, and the basic requirements of the citizens are fulfilled. Keeping this in mind, Morris Davis Morris presented the physical quality of life index, in short known as the PQLI. In this index, betterment of physical quality of life of human beings is considered economic development. The level of physical quality of life determines the level of economic development. If any country's physical quality of life is higher than that of the other country, then that country is considered as more developed. There are three standards to measure the physical quality, which are depicted here: 1)- Extent of Education, 2)- Life Expectancy & 3)- Infant Mortality Rate

== See also ==
- Basic Well-being Index (BWI)
- Human Poverty Index
- Quality-of-life Index, a different index calculated in 2005
- Quality of well-being scale
- Gross National Happiness
- Bhutan GNH Index
- Happiness economics
