= Business communication =

Process of sharing information between employees within and outside a company

Business communication is communication that is intended to help a business achieve a fundamental goal, through information sharing between employees as well as people outside the company. It includes the process of creating, sharing, listening, and understanding messages between different groups of people through written and verbal formats. The way that people communicate and operate within a business is very vital to how successful the company will be in the business world. Business communication occurs internally, employee-to-employee, or externally, business-to-business or business-to-consumer. This internal and external communication can happen through verbal or non-verbal communication methods. Often these internal and external forms of communication come with barriers, which can prevent the receiver from understanding the information sent by the sender.

== Overview ==
The word "communication" derives from the Latin word communis, which implies common. Thus, communication may be defined as the interchange of thoughts and information to bring about mutual understanding. Thus, communication may be defined as the interchange of thoughts and information to bring about mutual understanding on the subject's significance.

Business communication is closely related to professional communication and technical communication. It encompasses topics such as marketing, brand management, customer relations, consumer behavior, advertising, public relations, corporate communication, community engagement, reputation management, interpersonal communication, employee engagement, internal communication, and event management.

Communication in general is valued even more in international business communications to allow for the understanding of cultures and the overall morale of the operation.

Business communication focuses primarily on achieving goals and, in the case of a public company or organization, increasing the dividends of shareholders. Nonspecialist writers make up the business communication field as they traverse global business settings, rather than one specific area. In addition to writing, oral communication plays a big role in business communication practices.

In the past, organizational points and company policies were primarily communicated via paper documents. In the digital age, companies mostly exchange information virtually. Face-to-face meetings and presentations increasingly feature audiovisual material, like copies of reports, or material prepared in Microsoft PowerPoint or Adobe Flash. In the 21st century, computer-mediated communication, such as video conferencing and email, has become increasingly prevalent in business.

== Types of business communication ==
=== Internal ===
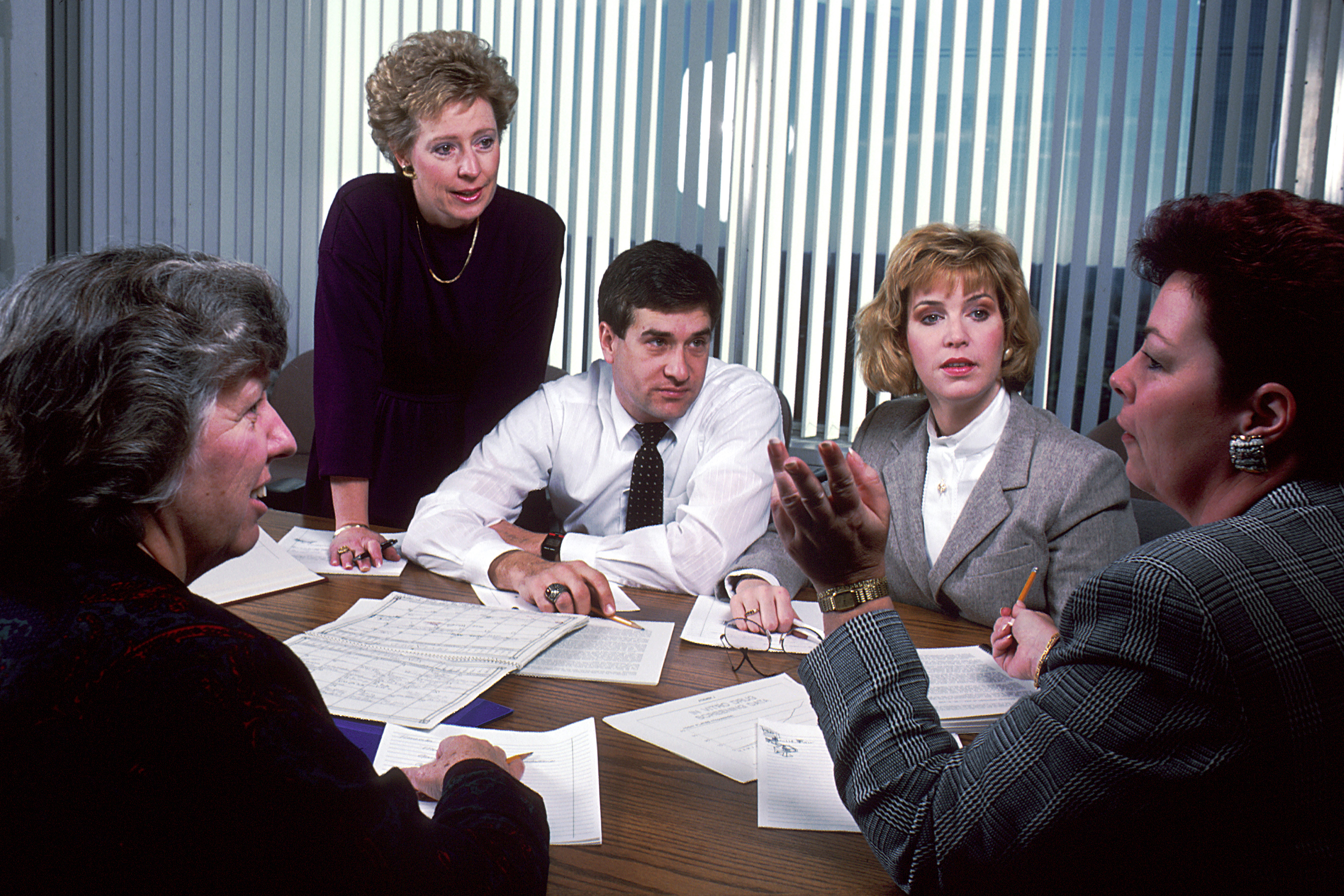
A group of people sit around an office conference table having a meeting.

Business-to-employee communication, also known as workplace communication, is the exchange of information within an organization. The purpose of some communications is to develop trust, and/or to increase productivity.

This type of business communication includes the flow of information from one level of the business hierarchy to another. Communication that flows from the top of the hierarchy to the bottom ("top-down communication") has been shown to decrease the stress levels of employees if it provides clarification and reassurance to the worker. The amount of information shared in this way is often dependent on a "need to know" basis. This communication may take the form of memos and other internal documents. Although a certain level of top-down communication is helpful, too much communication can be seen by the employee as micromanagement. Upward communication is any communication within the business that is passed through the business hierarchy from the bottom upwards. A suggestion box, which allows low-level workers to communicate with management anonymously, is one example of upward communication. Horizontal communication occurs between individuals who are on the same level in the business hierarchy.

Organizational communication involves meetings, the exchange of email messages, and collaboration on projects. It is determined that the success of communication among individuals within the organization underlines the company's success. It is important for business leaders to understand the role of communication in order to motivate employees to accomplish the company's goals. Low engagement in an organization can cost the global economy trillions of dollars a year.

=== External ===
Business-to-business communication involves sharing information between different companies, often done to benefit both parties. Business communication can help a company achieve its fundamental goals by informing, persuading, and building good relationships with other companies to reach mutual goals.

=== Methods of business communication ===
Internal and external types of business communication occur through verbal and non-verbal methods.

Almost all businesses use technology to communicate outside and inside an organization. Electronic communication includes emails, text messages, voice and video calls, and employee intranet and HR software. In modern businesses, email is the most dominant genre of this communication.

Communication may also be non-electronic. There will be times that an organization requires physical documents and paperwork, such as during face-to-face meetings.

Written forms of communication can be provided electronically and non-electronically, such as emails, letters, and contracts. Written documents may save time and money, and keep a record of what was said. These forms of communication are often written through multimodal editing. Multimodal editing is when an employee modifies various forms of text, such as emails or contracts. This editing adapts existing written work, or uses templates to streamline ideas. These templates often come at the cost of originality in email writing.

=== Effective business communication ===
Effective communication mainly revolves around how employees and management interact with one another to reach organizational goals. They accomplish this by improving organizational practices and reducing errors. All organized activity in a company relies on the process of business communication and the communication strategy. Business organizations today often prioritize efficiency and consistent models of business writing over creativity and originality. The importance of effective business communication also lies in:

- Presenting options/new business ideas
- Making plans and proposals (business writing)
- Executing decisions
- Reaching agreements
- Sending and fulfilling orders
- Successful selling
- Effective meetings
- Providing feedback to employees and customers

== Barriers to business communication ==
There are several barriers that a business might experience when communicating with business partners. Such barriers can prevent one from receiving or understanding messages others use to convey information, ideas, and thoughts.

== Business communication studies ==
Higher learning institutions offer communication courses, and many are now offering business communication courses. These courses teach students how to communicate more effectively. Attending these courses help students understand the communication barriers they might experience when communicating with others. It is suggested that 93% of employers believe that clear communication skills are more important than the students' actual major area of study. Communication competence is an ability that is sought after by employers and often leads to professional success. However, there is some disconnect between school education topics and actual business priorities. Classroom writing tends to focus more on learning skills like long-form drafting and creative writing, while workplaces today praise having strong competence in collaboration and adaptability in a team setting.

Other research in the business communication studies field identifies writing as its own stand-alone concept. By being isolated from other concepts such as “performance” or “information,” writing has its own unique place in the field, without relying on other ideas to give it meaning.

== Associations ==
- Founded in 1936 by Shankar, the Association for Business Communication (ABC), originally called the Association of College Teachers of Business Writing, is "an international, interdisciplinary organization committed to advancing business communication research, education, and practice."
- The IEEE Professional Communication Society (PCS) is dedicated to understanding and promoting effective communication in engineering, scientific, and other environments, including business environments. PCS's academic journal is one of the premier journals in Europe communication. The journal's readers are engineers, writers, information designers, managers, and others working as scholars, educators, and practitioners who share an interest in the effective communication of technical and business information.
- The Society for Technical Communication is a professional association dedicated to the advancement of the theory and practice of technical communication. With membership of more than 6,000 technical communicators, it is the largest organization of its type in North America.
- The International Business Communication Standards are practical proposals for the conceptual and visual design of comprehensible reports and presentations.

== See also ==
- Strategic talk
