= Gibb categories =

Interpersonal communication strategy

The Gibb categories are elements of a strategy for interpersonal communication. Separated into defensive and supportive techniques, the categories provide a framework for effective communication. The categories are outlined by Jack Gibb.

Gibb categories point out six defensive behaviors used during interpersonal communication. Gibb has six opposing viewpoints that are known as supportive behaviors. Defensive behaviors are carried out when a person feels threatened during communication and hence the need to defend him or herself. Supportive communication is important as humans interact, as people need to feel a connection with other people. Gibb believes that there are times and places when to use his methods of communication. He states that his ideas are better created for cultures like the United States where communication is more direct. Also, there are times when supportive behaviors should be considered the wrong type of communication. It is important to know which type of communication is needed in a given situation.

== Evaluation vs. Description ==
- The first form of defensive behavior is evaluation. These are known as "you" statements and put all the focus on the other person. This kind of behavior is about judging the other communicator.
- In return the supportive behavior is description. This focuses on the communicator's ideas rather than putting blame on someone else. Description behavior is about the feelings of the speaker and can be described as "I" statements.

== Control vs. Problem Orientation ==
- The second defensive behavior is control, which is when one person is forcing a solution upon the other person. This means that the speaker is making a decision that affects both the speaker and the listener without considering what the listener wants or needs.
- The supportive behavior that contrasts control is problem orientation. This is when a person looks for a solution that will satisfy both people. Finding a solution that will please both people is more important than one person winning and the other person losing.

== Strategy vs. Spontaneity ==
- Strategy is another form of defensive behavior, which can be used when a person feels threatened. This form is about manipulating the other person to come out on top. Strategy can be very hurtful as the speaker is being deceitful.
- Spontaneity is about being honest and truthful with the listener. There are times when the truth should not be so direct but knowing when to be direct and when to be subtle is key to good communication.

== Neutrality vs. Empathy ==
- The fourth type of defensive behavior is neutrality. This is when the speaker has little concern or interest in the conversation. Neutrality makes the listener feel unwelcome and unimportant.
- The opposite of this is empathy. Empathy allows for an acceptance of the other person and their feelings. This can be taken as both verbal and non-verbal messages as communication is not linear and both communicators are giving and receiving messages at all times.

== Superiority vs. Equality ==
- Another form of defensive behavior in communication is superiority. This is when a person believes that they are better than the listener and can be shown by the way the speaker delivers the message.
- Equality is a contrasting behavior and shows that all people have self-worth. There are times when a speaker may be smarter or be better at something than the listener but speaking to them at the same level is important.

== Certainty vs. Provisionalism ==
- The final defensive behavior is certainty. When communicators believe they are right and that the other person is wrong and will not listen to the other person's ideas they are demonstrating certainty behavior.
- Provisionalism is the supportive behavior that contrasts certainty. This is when one person feels they are correct but is willing to listen to the other person and is prepared to change their mind or opinion if the other idea is more reasonable.

== Conclusion ==
The six different defensive and supportive behaviors are used during interpersonal communication. There are times when both types of communication should be used and times when they should not be used. Understanding when to use different communication skills is key to effective interpersonal communication.
