= Upward communication =

Type of communication in hierarchical organisations

Upward communication is the process of information flowing from the lower levels of a hierarchy to the upper levels. This type of communication is becoming more popular in organizations as traditional forms of communication are becoming less popular. The more traditional organization types such as a hierarchy, places people into separate ranks. The ways in which low status members of such hierarchies communicate with higher status members has been a subject of study, and the term 'upward communication' has been used since at least the 1960s.

Upward communication helps employees to express their requirements, ideas, and feelings. For the top management, upward communication is an important source of informations for business decisions. It helps in alerting top management about the requirement of changes in an organisations. Upward contribution is the core contributor of business process reengineering in many organisations.

Upward communication is widely used as part of whistleblowing policy in many large organisations. Under whistle blowing policy, each employee is permitted to directly communicate with top management about matters requiring examination on vigilance angle. Hence it is used as a fraud prevention tool as well.

Upward communication keeps managers aware of how employees feel about their jobs, policies and procedures, and the business in general. It consists of methods like Feedback from employees, helps in bringing mutual trust and helps the organization to determine, implement or decide upon new policies. It keeps the organization updated or prone to upcoming challenges.

Upward communication is not free from disadvantages. It suffers from problems like information can be changed during transmission, unwillingness to participate, fear of inefficiency, bypassing and flattery. Sometimes top level executives discourage the upward flow of information and neglect the constructive suggestions and opinions about the work related issues of the organization. It is a time taking process and is comparatively slow.

The concept has also been applied to educational organisations, in the context of communication from teachers to school principals.
