= Quality of well-being scale =

Quality of life questionnaire

The Quality of Well-Being Scale (QWB) is a general health quality of life questionnaire which measures overall status and well-being over the previous three days in four areas: physical activities, social activities, mobility, and symptom/problem complexes.

It consists of 71 items and takes 20 minutes to complete. There are two different versions of the QWB; the original was designed to be administered by an interviewer, and the second development (the QWB-SA) was designed to be self-administered.

The four domain scores of the questionnaire are combined into a total score that ranges from 0 to 1.0, with 1.0 representing optimum function and 0 representing death.

== Development ==
The QWB was originally called the Health Status Index, then the Index of Well-Being, and then eventually became the Quality of Well-Being Scale. It has undergone several modifications since its development.

The process of administering the QWB can be described in three stages. They are the assessment of functional status, scaling the responses and indicating prognosis.

Assessment of functional status involves a structured interview which records the symptoms and problems experienced over the last eight days. It is used to classify the patient’s level of functioning. The interview takes about seven minutes or longer, according to the patient’s level of health. Questions in the interview covered three criteria of functioning: physical activity, social activity and mobility and confinement. The interview also records the presence of symptoms or problem complexes, which are problems that were experienced on the previous day, but were not being experienced at the present time.

The responses from the interview were then scaled. Preference weights were given for each function level by 867 raters. The preference weights indicated the social judgement of the importance of each function level. A score is generated, which is known as W. W can then be adjusted to reflect the prognosis of a given medical condition.

== International use ==
Since the development of the Quality of Well-Being Scale and the consequent Quality of Well-Being Scale-Self Administered, the questionnaire has been utilized in numerous studies worldwide. Due to the general nature of the questionnaire, it has proven useful in a variety of different formats and contexts.

One way in which the QWB and the QWB-SA has been utilized is that it has been a comparator used to validate other measures, or a starting point for creating subscales of the questionnaire. An example of this is a subscale developed for use with the QWB-SA that assesses mental health, a comparator study seeking to investigate the Health and Activity Limitation Index and a study seeking to validate a new questionnaire called the Assessment of Quality of Life (AQoL)-8D.

The QWB and the QWB-SA have also been validated or assessed for suitability in various cultures and countries. The QWB has been assessed for use in Trinidad and Tobago and the QWB-SA has been validated for German patients with prostate disease, as well as Chinese patients with epilepsy. When the QWB-SA's Spanish version was assessed for its applicability in Spain, researchers identified some sociocultural issues in the translation. For example, some translated terms and usage applied US-specific concepts and regional lexical choices and cannot be successfully implemented in Spain without adaptation.

== See also ==
- Self-perceived quality-of-life scale
