= President of the Legislative Assembly =

President of the Legislative Assembly may refer to any of the following presiding officers (speakers) of parliamentary bodies styled legislative assemblies:

- President of the Legislative Assembly of Macau of the Legislative Assembly of Macau
- President of the Legislative Assembly of Costa Rica of the Legislative Assembly of Costa Rica
- President of the Legislative Assembly of El Salvador of the Legislative Assembly of El Salvador
- President of the Legislative Assembly of the Federal District of the Legislative Assembly of the Federal District

== See also ==
- Speaker of the Legislative Assembly
