= Debate chamber =

Room for people to discuss and debate

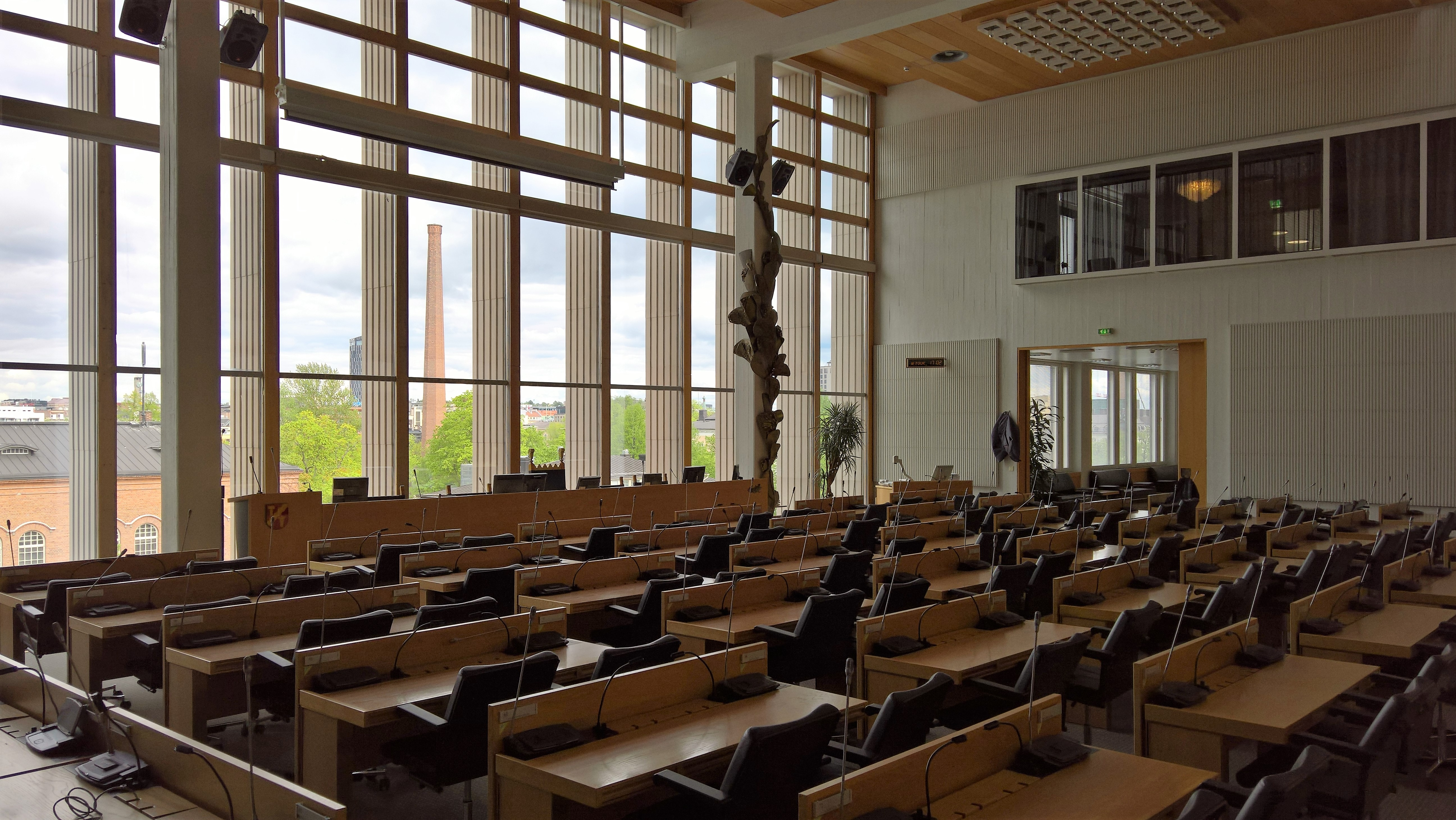
A debate chamber of the City Council of Tampere in the City Central Office Building of Tampere, Finland

A debate chamber is a room for conducting the business of a deliberative assembly or otherwise for debating. When used as the meeting place of a legislature, a debate chamber may also be known as a council chamber, legislative chamber, assembly chamber, or similar term depending on the relevant body. Some countries, such as New Zealand, use the term debating chamber as a name for the room where the legislature meets.

== Debating ==
Debating can happen more or less anywhere that is not immediately hazardous. Whether informal or structured, debates often have an audience. The debate does not involve the audience as such; they may even be watching remotely. Therefore, a debate can occur basically anywhere, even in the street, in a hallway, on board a moving vehicle, or any number of other unusual locations.

However, in common parlance, a debating chamber is a room set aside for the purposes of holding debates, usually permanently. It usually contains furniture set up to organize the debate, so as to clearly separate the people participating in the debate and the audience, and usually to clearly separate the sides of the debate. If the format of the debate includes a moderator (such as the speaker of a legislature) they must sit in a clear position of authority.

In general, a debate chamber has seats and tables for the moderator and the debate participants, and a separate seating area for the audience. Other facilities may include one or more podiums for delivering speeches, possibly located on a stage to facilitate presentation of the debate to an audience. Recording and broadcasting equipment may be installed in a debating chamber so that proceedings there can be shown to the public at large. In the case of a legislative chamber or the like, there may be separate galleries for the public, while members of the legislature (and appropriate staff) are the only ones permitted in the chamber proper.

== Psychology and geometry ==
The configuration of seating affects interpersonal communication on conscious and subconscious levels. For example, disagreements over the shape of a negotiation table delayed the Vietnam War peace talks for almost a year.

The geometry of seating position can support or determine a sense of opposition/confrontation, hierarchy/dominance, or collaboration/equality. Factors such as angle/rotation, proximity/distance, median/termini, and height/incline are all relevant considerations. The more directly two parties are positioned across from one another, the more likely their relationship will be one of opposition to each other; the less direct, or more "side-by-side" these positions are, the less likely such an opposing relationship becomes, but also the less effective it will be at fostering collaboration.

These effects can be observed in debate chambers, meeting rooms, and at dining or restaurant tables. For instance, with a long rectangular table, those seated at the "head" or "end" of the table are in a position of dominance; they can see everybody, and normally everybody can see them, but the others are restricted to seeing only those across from them. Circular, square, or elliptical tables facilitate more equal status between those seated, as well as less obstructed lines of sight. A circular gathering with three participants provides the only non-oppositional configuration of more than two persons that allows equal line of sight (all 120 degrees apart).

The smaller the group and setting, the greater the equity of participants and sight lines. Conversely, the more participants that are present, the greater is the disparity of sight lines between those sitting immediately adjacent and those more directly across, whose position in turn becomes more oppositional. Winston Churchill recognized this when he insisted the British House of Commons be rebuilt (after wartime bombing) in a similar size and configuration as the prior chamber, to maintain the intimate and adversarial style of debate which he believed was responsible for creating the British form of government.

== History ==
Whether outdoors or in an enclosed space or chamber, such as a cave, it is likely that the earliest designated places for group discourse or debate occurred around a fire, for light, heat, or protection from predators. Throughout recorded history there have been a variety of places and spaces designated for similar purposes. An early gathering for assembly purposes was the Ecclesia of ancient Athens, a popular assembly open to all male citizens with two years of military service. This was held in an Ekklesiasterion, which varied from small amphitheaters to a variety of buildings, including ones that could accommodate over 5,000 people. These assemblies were also held in amphitheater-like, open air theaters. Bouleuterions, also translated as council house, assembly house, and senate house, was a building in ancient Greece which housed the council of citizens of a democratic city state. In Ancient Rome, the earliest recorded debating chamber was for the deliberative body of the Roman Senate.

The first official debating model that emerged (centuries later) after the fall of the Roman Empire was the Magnum Concilium, or Great Council, after the Norman Conquest of England in 1066. These were convened at certain times of the year when church leaders and wealthy landowners were invited to discuss the affairs of the country with the king (of England, Normandy, and France). In the 13th century this developed into the Parliament of England (concilium regis in parliamento). Similar models emerged at roughly the same time with the Parliament of Scotland and Parliament of Ireland. These were later consolidated into the Parliament of Britain and the current Parliament of the United Kingdom (or British Parliament). The system of government that emerged in this model is known as the Westminster system. In Europe, similar models to parliament emerged, termed Diet and Thing, or Ting, thing derived from old Norse for "appointed time" or "assembly". The parliament that claims to have the longest continuous existence is the Tynwald of the Isle of Man. In 19th century Russia, the Duma emerged to perform similar advisory functions to the monarch.

In the 14th century, the king of France established the Estates General, a legislative and consultative assembly of the different classes (or estates) of French subjects. In the 18th Century French Revolution, this was transformed into the National Assembly (1789), the National Constituent Assembly (1789–1791), the Legislative Assembly (1971–1792), the National Convention (1792–1795), the Council of Five Hundred (1795–1799), and eventually the tricameral (three-house) French Consulate during the reign of Napoleon Bonaparte. These bodies met in a variety of palaces, a riding academy, a large theater, and a tennis court.

In the late 18th century the United States of America established the U.S. Congress, a bicameral legislative model that would form the template of many newly emergent republics around the world. The form adopted involved two legislative bodies, each with its own chamber. The lower house, the U.S. House of Representatives, was intended to provide representation based on population. The upper house, the U.S. Senate, was intended to provide more deliberative oversight on legislation and was to represent the States (equally). Each was created and its chambers designed before political parties were well established.

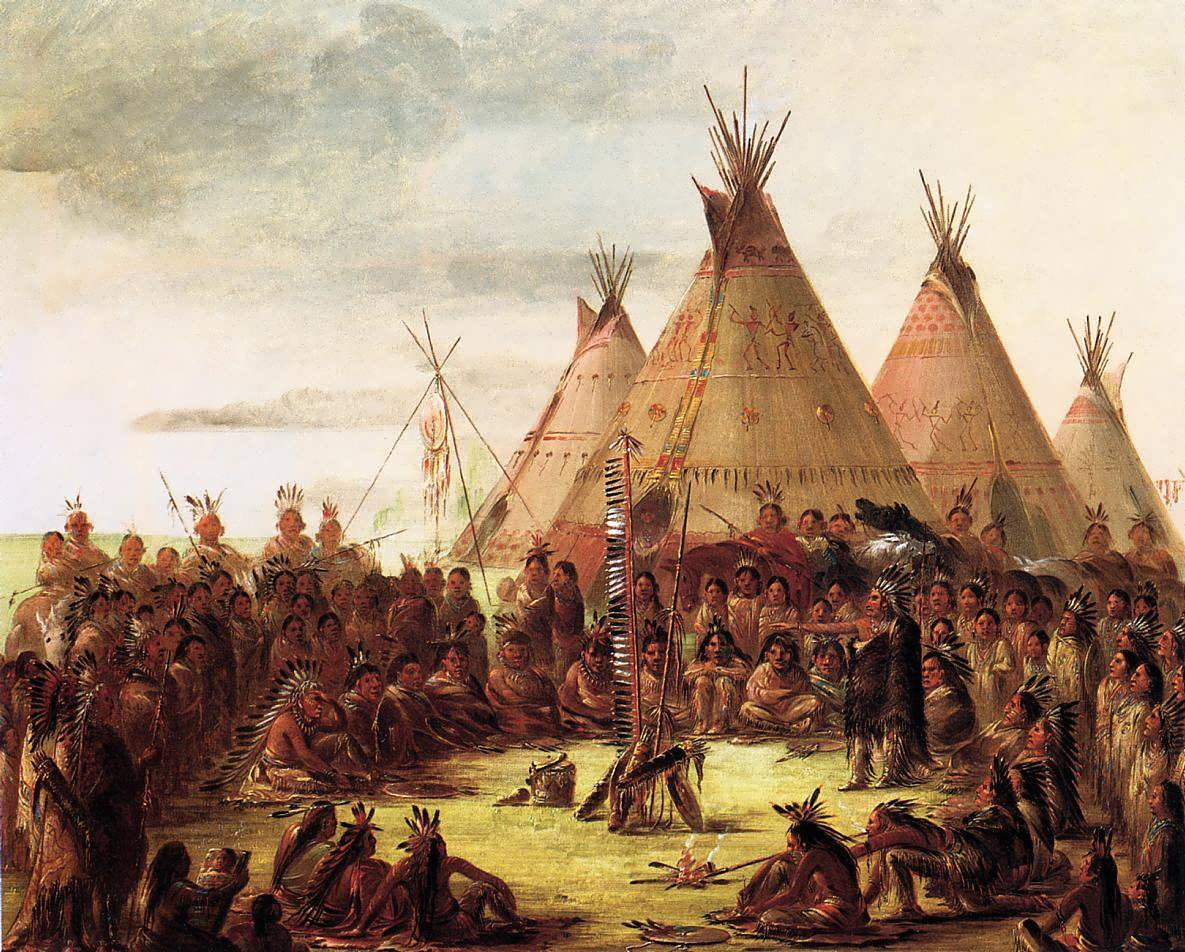
19th century painting depicting a meeting of North American indigenous people.

Ancient Greek theater

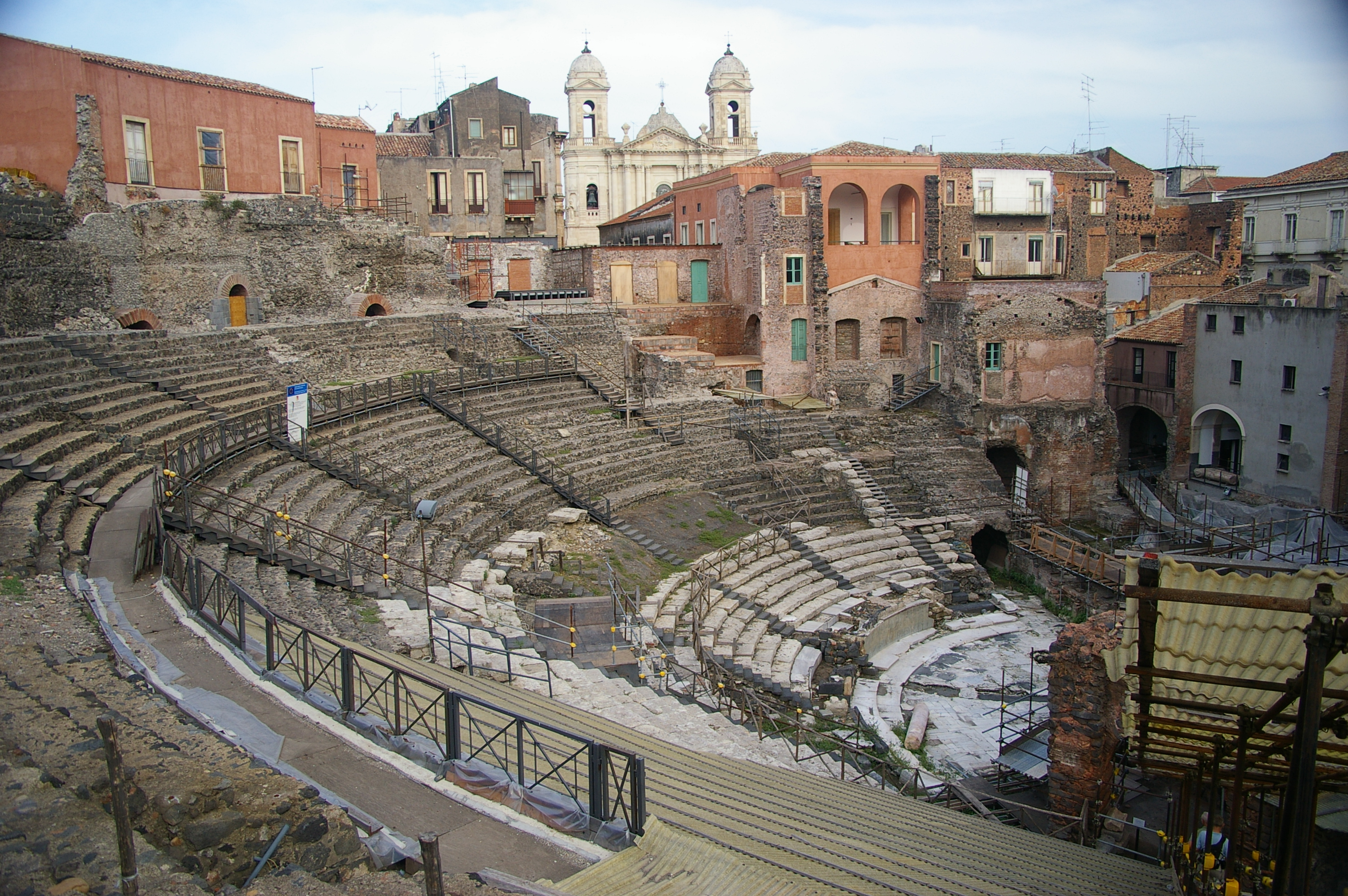
Catania Greek-Roman theater

== Names ==
The names given to debating places or spaces may refer to an activity, such as assembly or debating; it may refer to the persons performing that activity, such as noblemen (Oireachtas in Ireland), lords, or estates; or it may refer to both, such as Senate (derived from the Latin for elder, and assembly). Some examples of the more common names for debating spaces:

- Assembly, also Dáil in Irish, as in National Assembly.
- Chamber or House, as in House of Representatives or Chamber of Deputies.
- Council, as in Magnum Concilium, or Federal Council.
- Diet derived from Medieval Latin dieta, meaning assembly. Used in reference to many historical European assemblies, such as the Imperial Diet of the Holy Roman Empire, the Diet of Worms, or the Hungarian Diet. The term is also used in reference to the modern-day Japanese parliament. Cognate terms include the German Tag (Bundestag, Landtag) and Dag in various Scandinavian languages (Riksdag, Rigsdagen).
- Duma: Russian, meaning "consider".
- Parliament: derived from Anglo-Norman parler, meaning speak.
- Rada: Derived from Old East Slavic Рада, meaning council (ex. Verkhovna Rada in Ukraine, meaning Supreme Council).
- Sejm: Proto-Lechitic, meaning "gathering" or "meeting".
- Senate: used in many countries since the time of Ancient Rome, where the Senate (Latin senatus) was an assembly of elders (the term derives from senex, meaning "old man").
- Thing: Derived from Proto-Germanic *þingą meaning "appointed time", later "meeting" or "assembly". A thing was historically the governing assembly of a Germanic society, made up of the free people of the community presided over by lawspeakers. Modern day cognates include Icelandic: þing, German or Dutch ding, and ting in modern Scandinavian languages. In English, the word "thing" has not kept its original meaning of "assembly", although it retains that sense in derived terms such as "husting", and the name of the Manx parliament, the Tynwald.
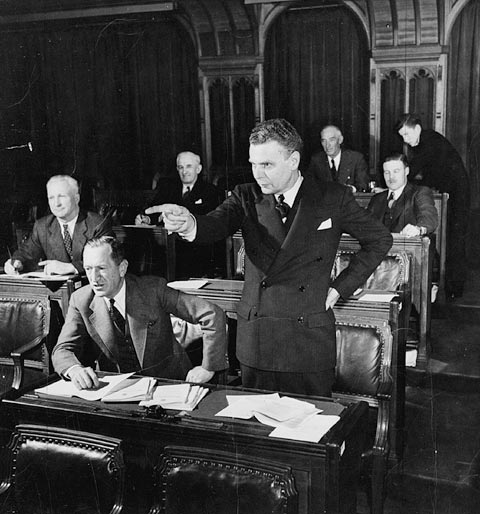
Westminster style parliamentary debate: John G. Diefenbaker in the House of Commons of Canada, 1956

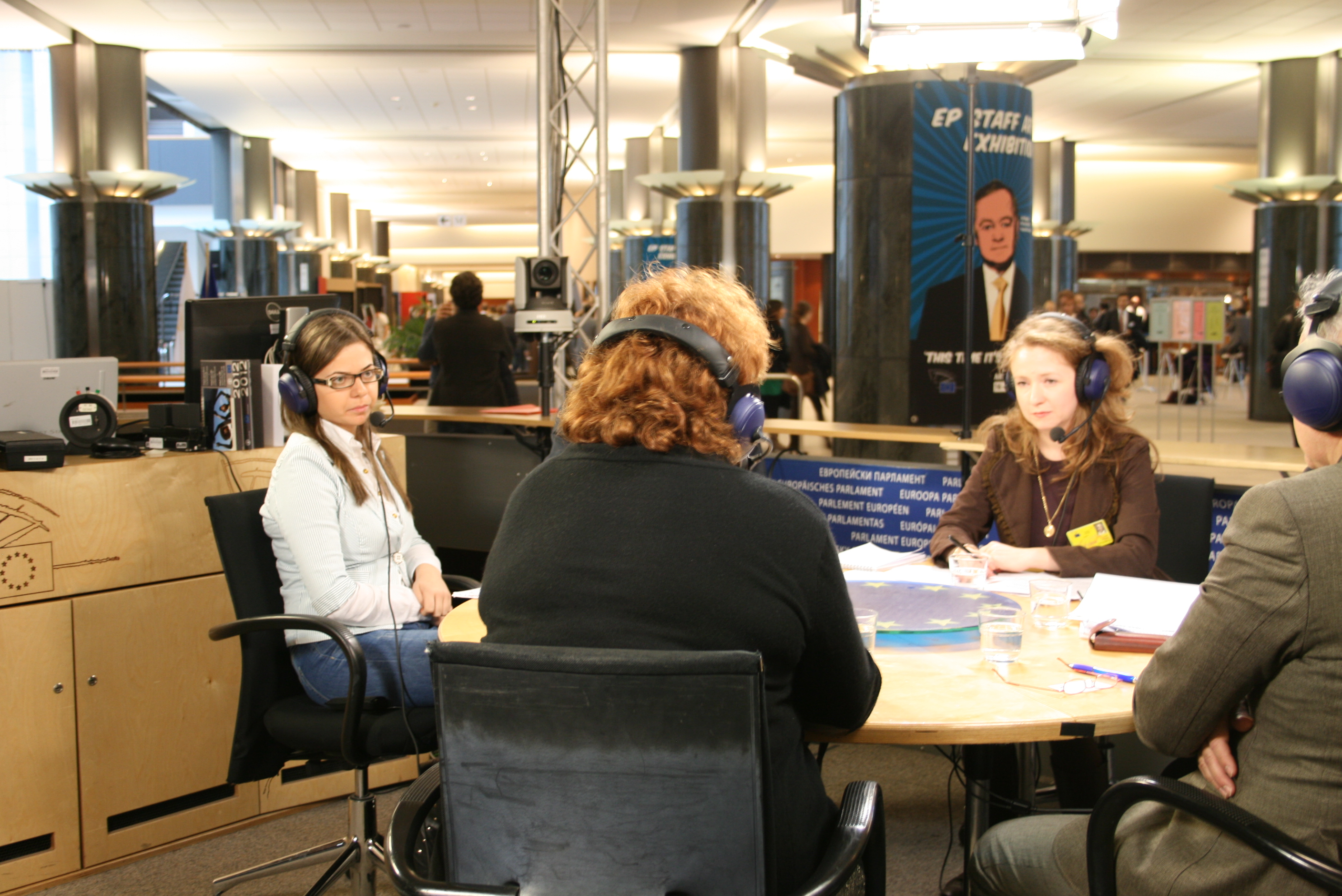
Square table with four participants

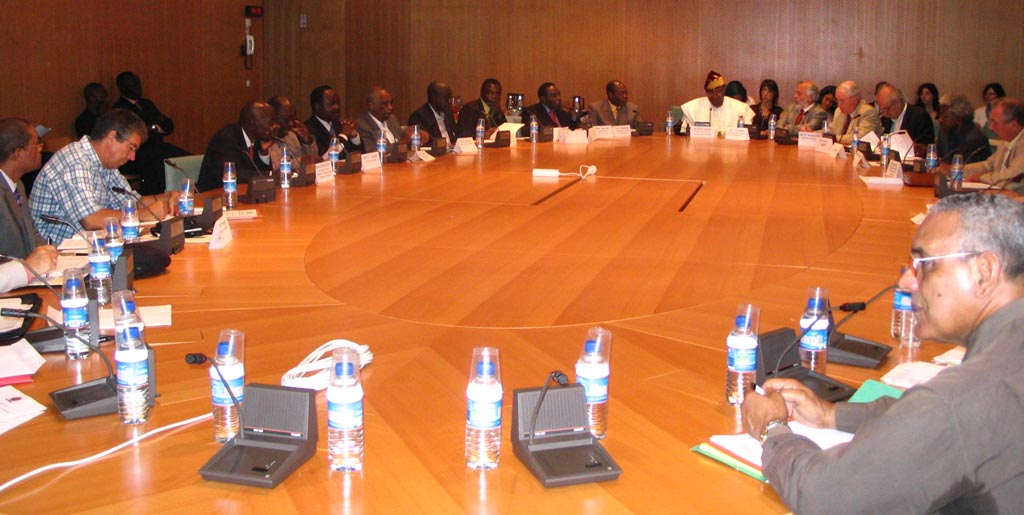
Circular conference table with multiple participants

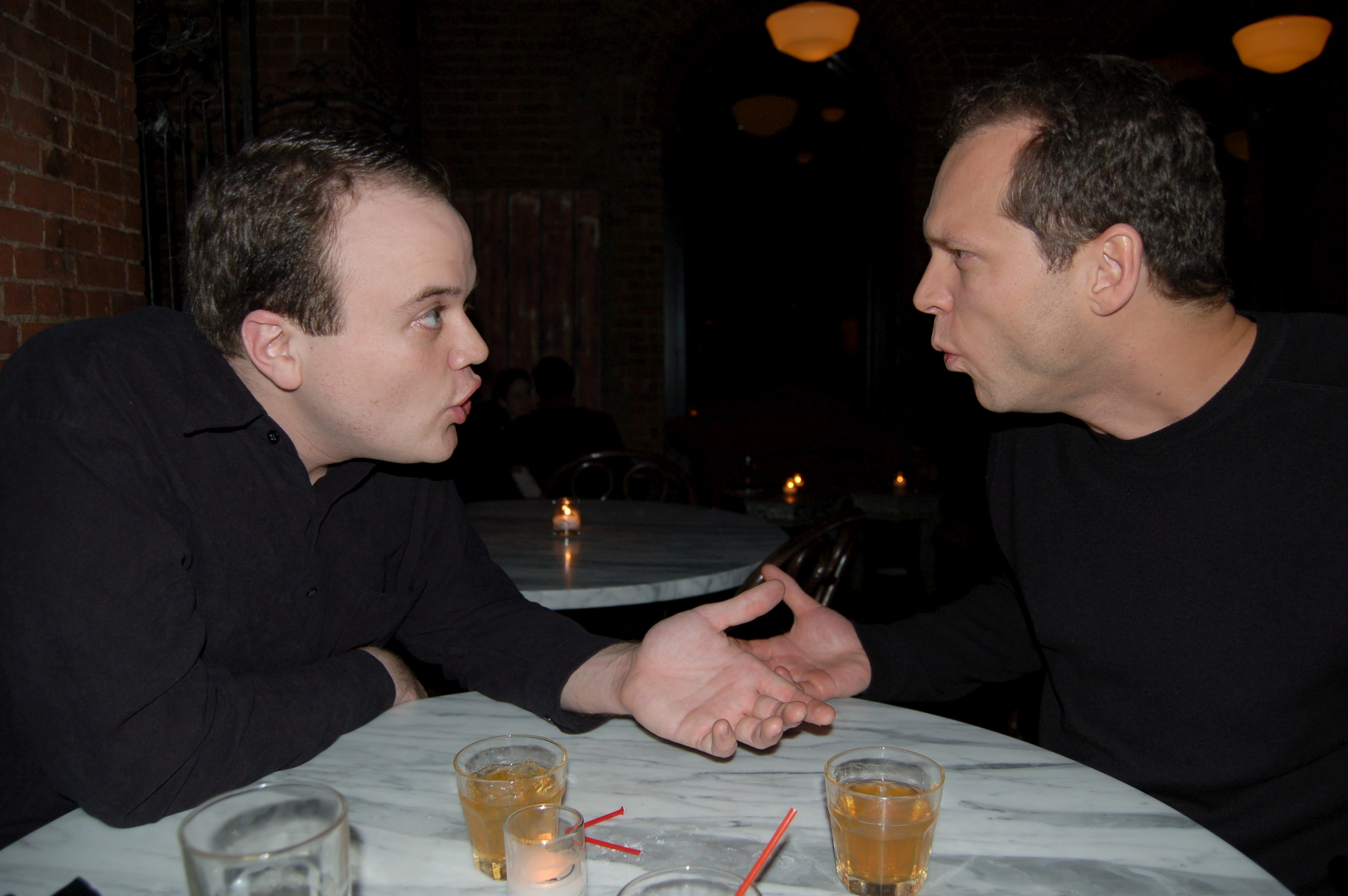
Face to face with two participants

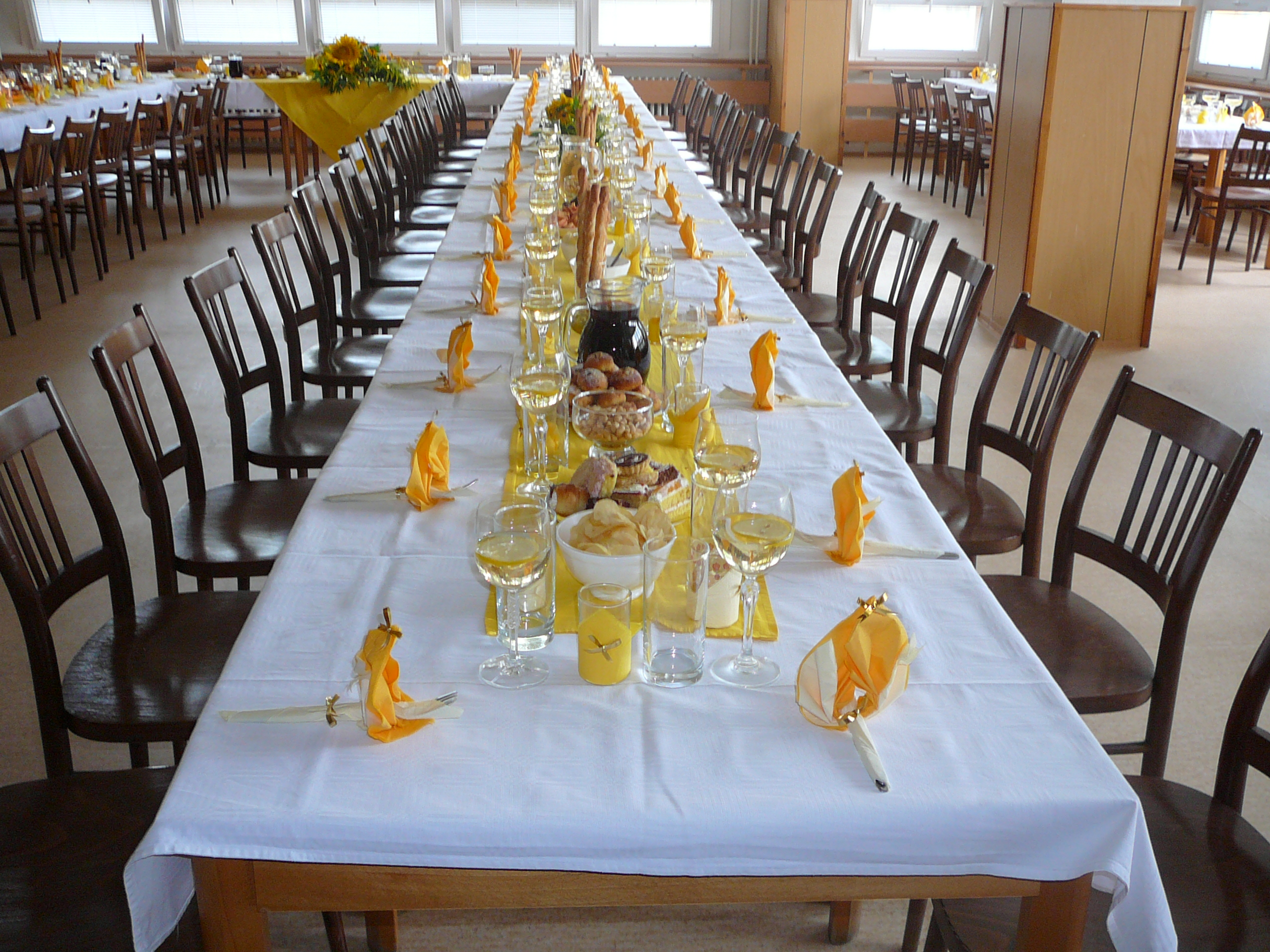
Long table with oppositional seating

== Seating configuration ==
There are several common configurations of seating used in debate chambers: auditorium, rectangular, fan-shaped, circular, and hybrids. The shapes of the room vary and do not necessarily reflect or match the seat configurations. The architectural design of the chamber can shape the style of debating: a semicircular design may promote discussion for the purpose of reaching a consensus, while an arrangement with two opposing sides may promote adversarial debating.

=== Auditorium ===
The auditorium form of seating (and chamber) is a large audience facing a stage, often with a proscenium. The model is similar to direct instruction whereby the communication is unidirectional without active interaction or debate. Response is limited to applause or speakers coming onto the stage, from the audience or backstage, to provide a subsequent presentation to the audience. Given the scale and format, there is little opportunity for any direct discourse.

Examples and images: USSR Supreme Soviet

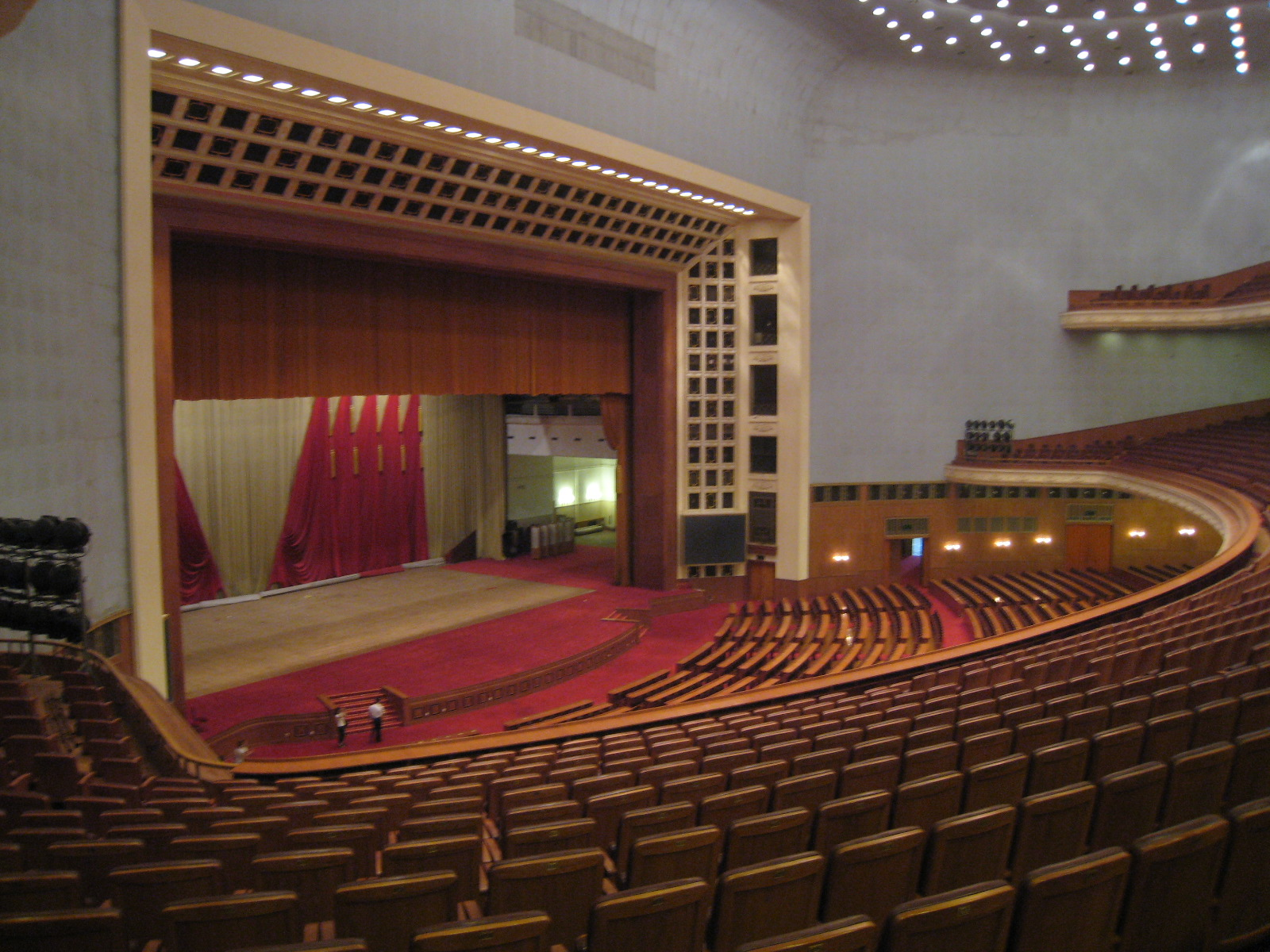
China's Great Hall of the People

=== Council and court ===
The council and courtroom configuration of seating is one that fosters interaction between the "panel" (court, council, board, or other officials) and the public. The panel members may debate or engage in discourse amongst themselves, particularly in a council of elected officials, but that is not normally the main portion of discourse. The more linear the seating arrangement is, the less supportive of it is for discourse. City Council chamber are less likely to use a linear configuration whereas judges in a court of law (where there is more than one judge in a sitting) frequently sit in a straight or nearly straight line.

Examples and images:

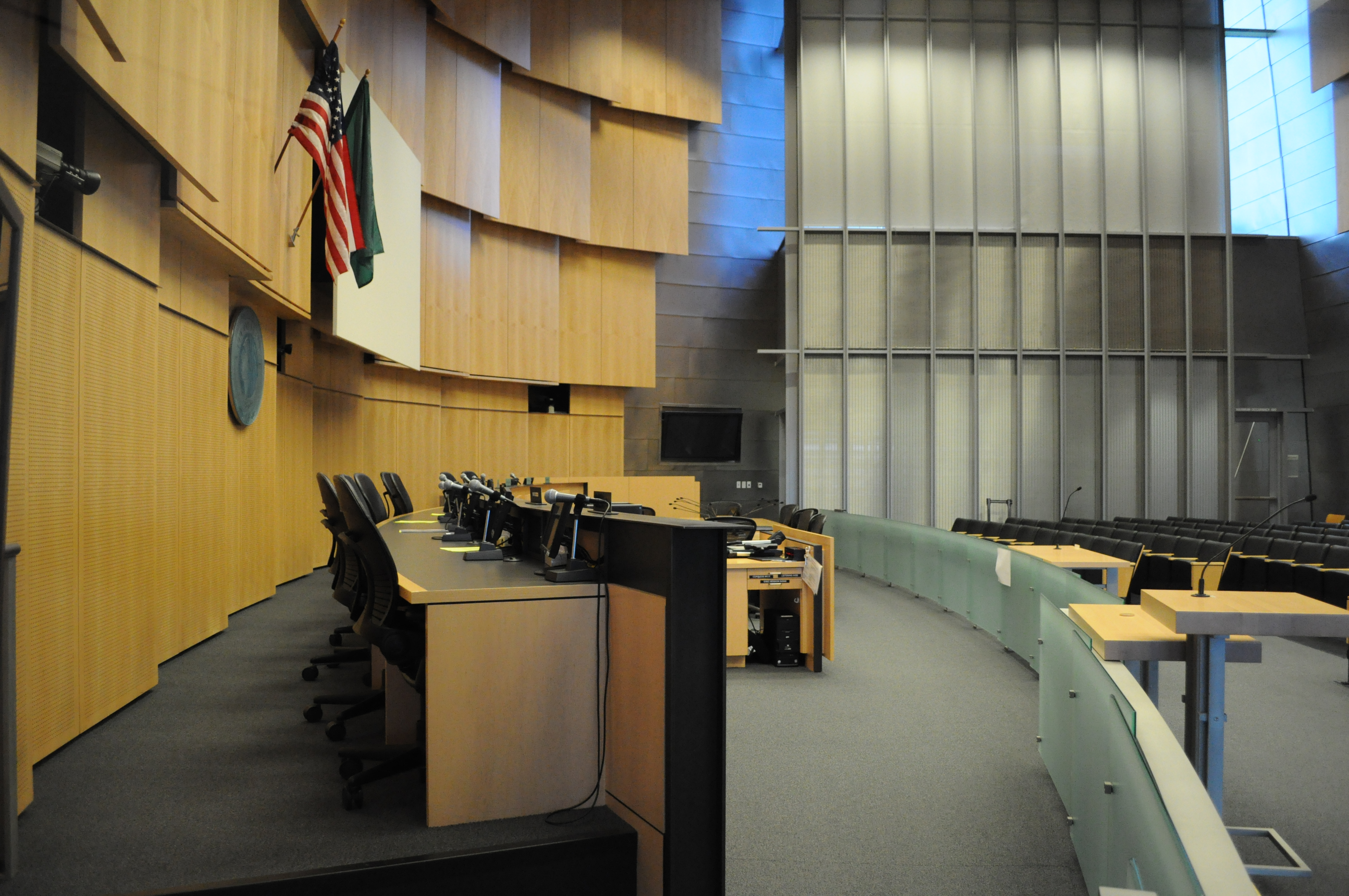
Seattle City Council chamber

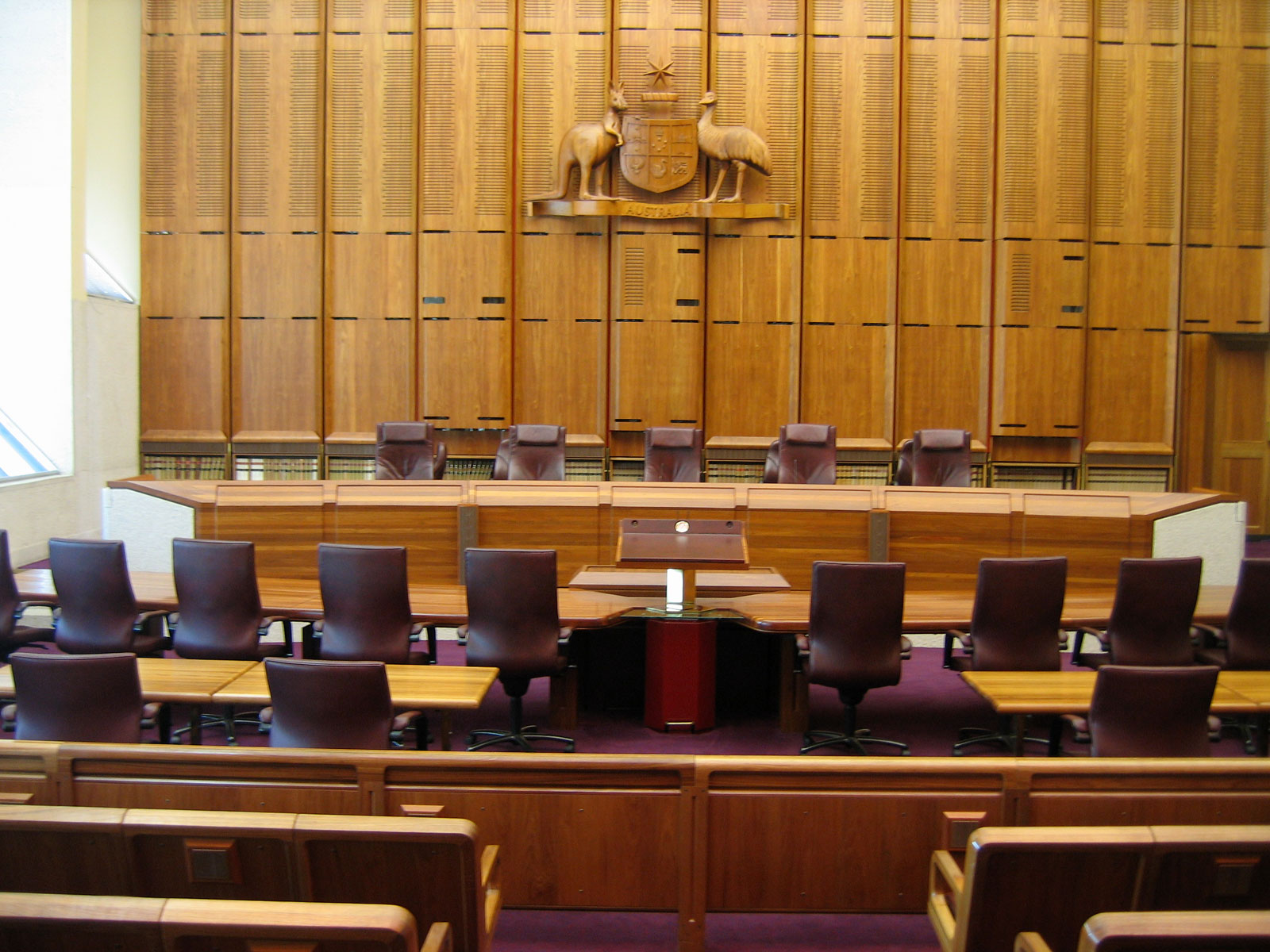
High Court of Australia

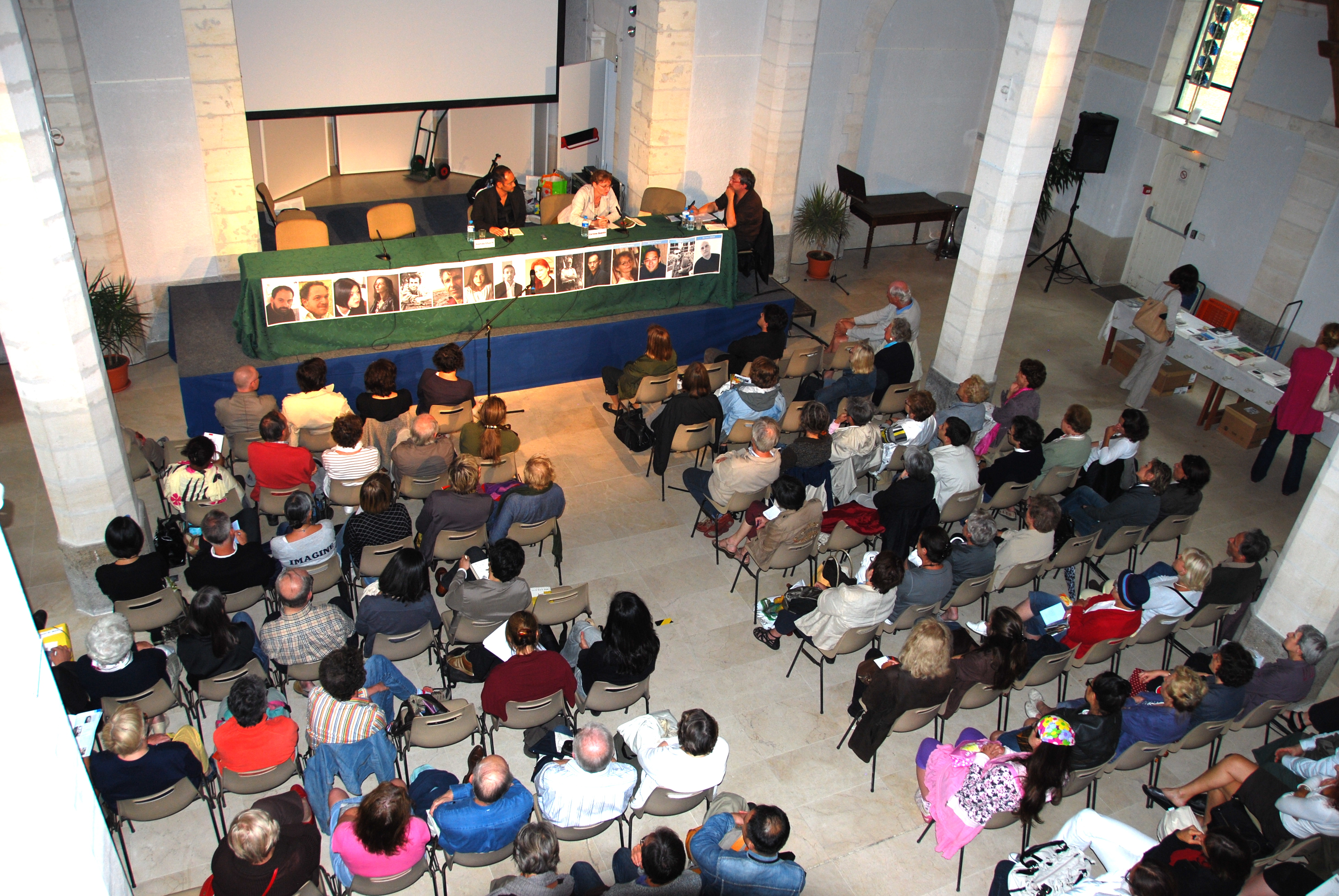
Panel presentation

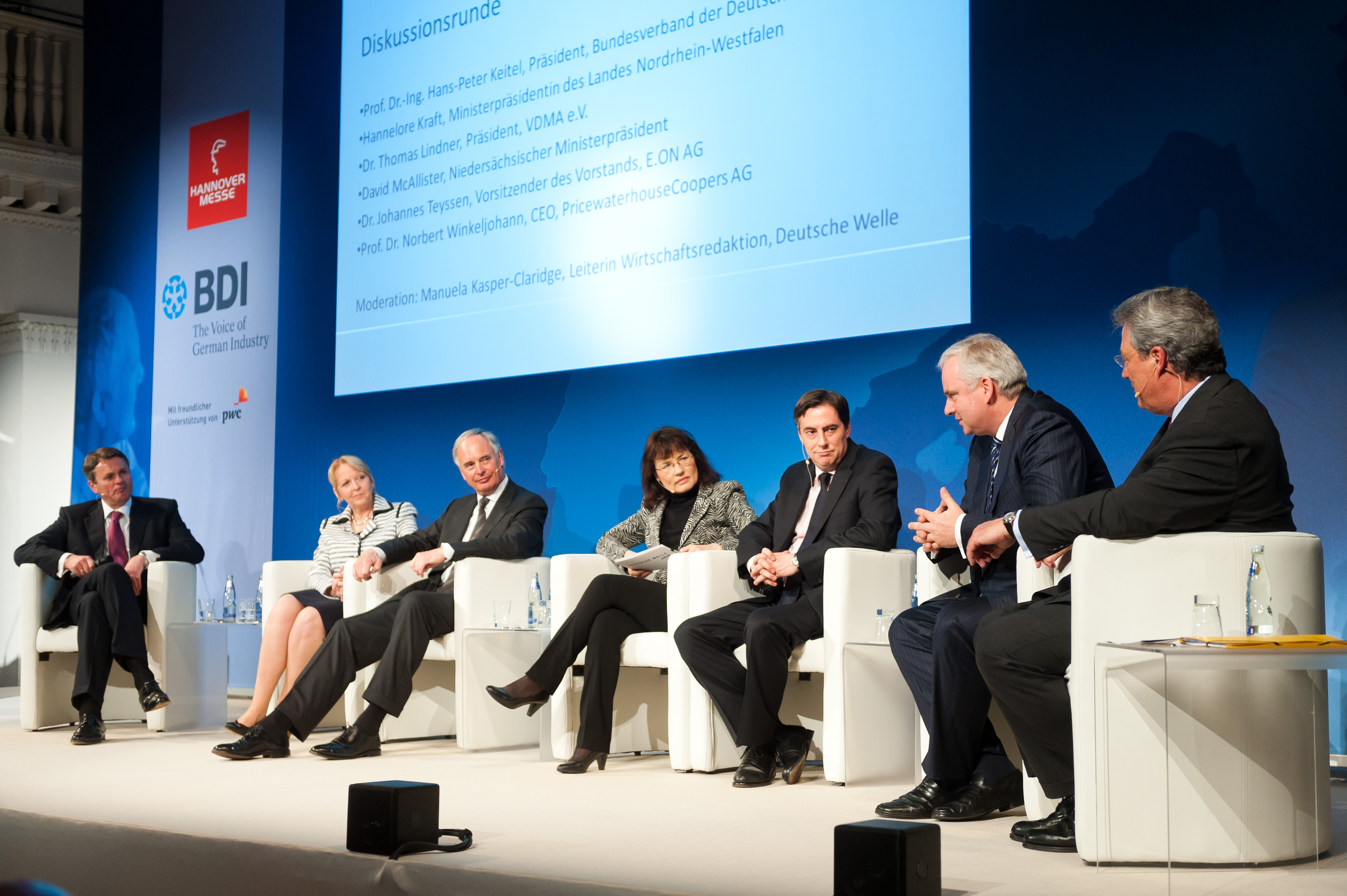
Informal panel discussion

=== Rectangular ===
The rectangular (bifurcated) seating configuration comprises two opposing rows of seats or benches facing towards a central aisle which bisects the room. At one end is commonly found a chair, throne, or podium for a Speaker, a monarch or president, or chairperson, respectively. This format is used in the Westminster style of parliamentary debating chambers, such as in the Parliaments of the UK, Canada, Australia, New Zealand, and other former British colonies. In this configuration, on one side of the aisle is the government and the other the opposition. This supports oppositional or divided groupings, from which emerged in the 19th century the two-party political system in the UK, and its dominions and colonies. Each person speaking is nominally directing his or her comments towards the speaker, but they do so facing the opposing members with their own group facing the same way they are. Without having one's own side turn around, it is not possible to face all members of the chamber simultaneously. In the British Parliament, the traditional method of recorded voting is called "division of the assembly" is by members placing themselves in separate rooms called division lobbies, one each for the "Ayes" and "Noes". (This is derived from the Roman Senate which voted by division, by a senator seating himself on one side of the chamber or the other to indicate a vote.

Common folklore speaks of the aisle between the government and the opposition sides as being "two sword lengths", or "two sword lengths plus an inch", apart, although there is no record of this being a criterion.

Examples and images: House of Commons of Canada, House of Commons of the United Kingdom, Cortes of Castilla–La Mancha

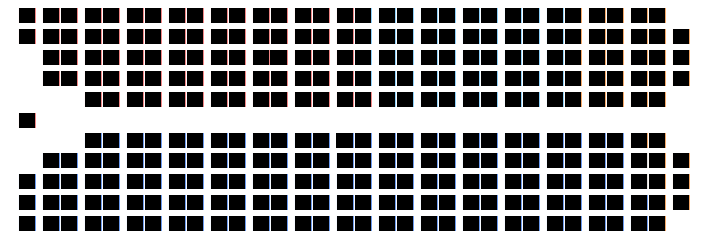
Seating plan of the Chamber of the House of Commons of Canada (the speaker's chair is to the left)

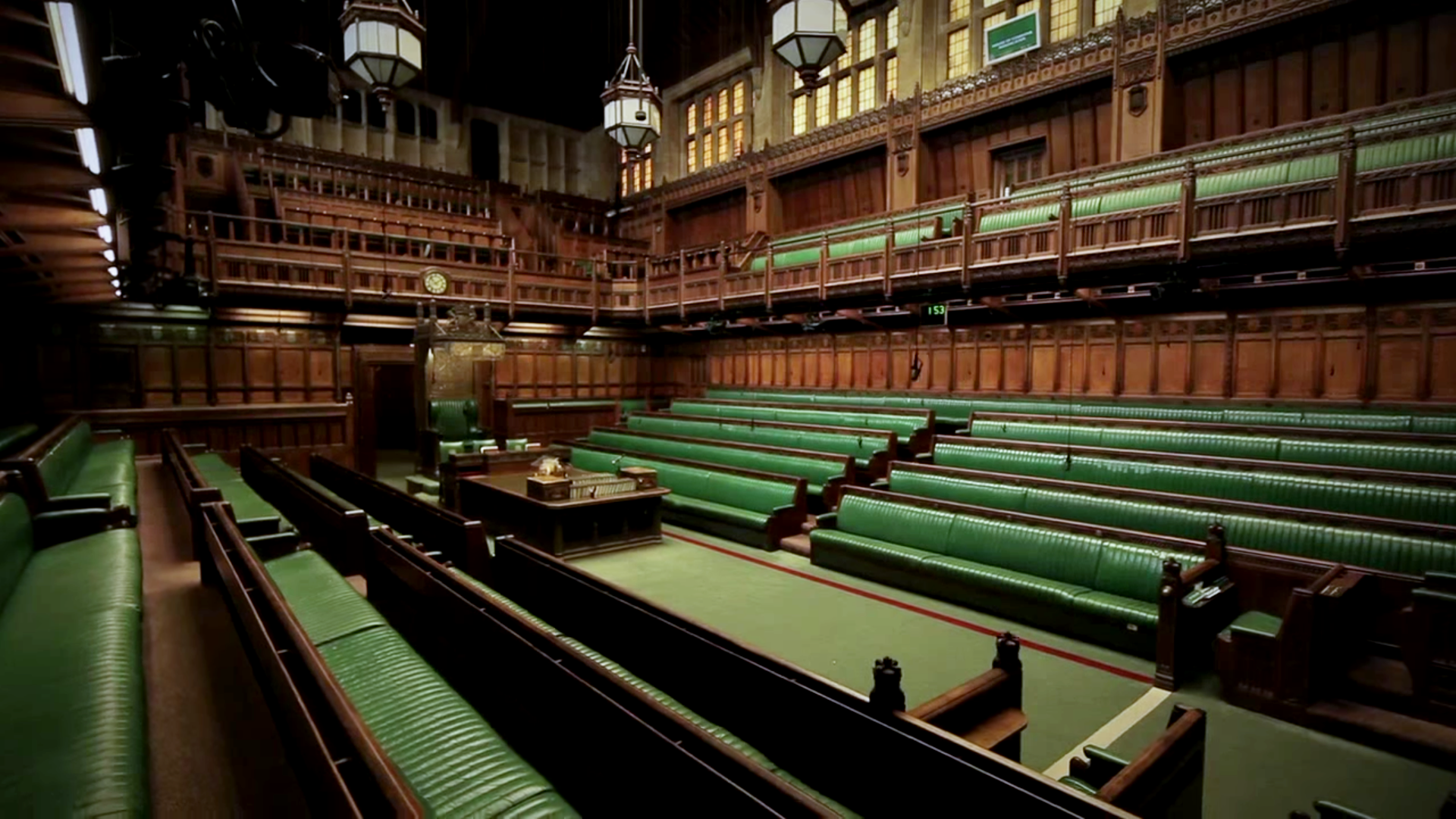
Chamber of the House of Commons of the United Kingdom

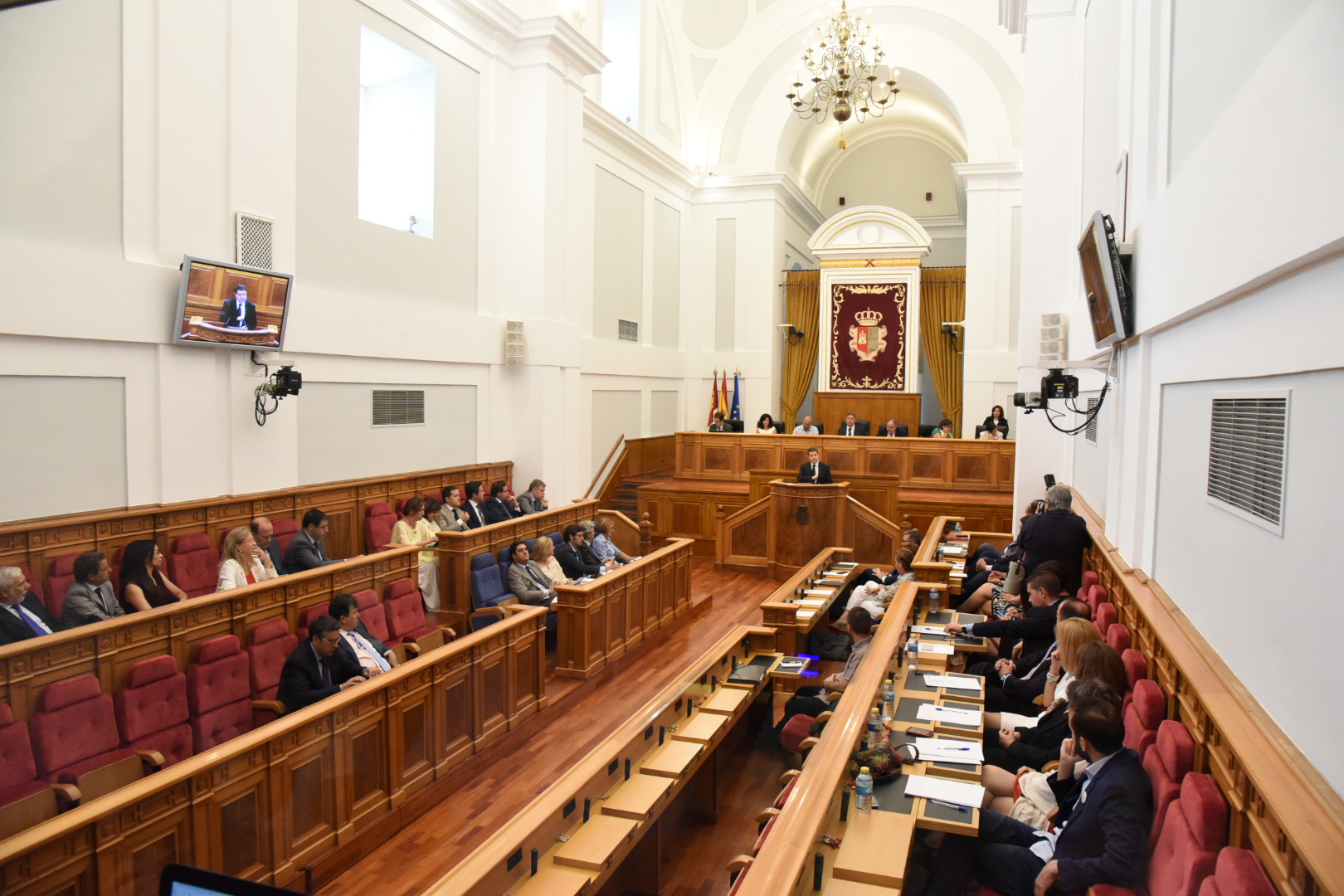
Chamber of the Cortes of Castilla–La Mancha

=== Hybrid ===
A hybrid of the bifurcated and semi-circular seating configurations combines a central aisle with a curved end at one end facing the focal point (e.g. Speaker's chair) at the other. Another hybrid form is one that is rectangular, but not bi-furcated; the overall arrangement is rectangular, as is each of the three seat groupings. For example, in both the lower house of the Czech Republic's Chamber of Deputies and in the Palace of Assembly at Chandigarh, India, the seating arrangement is a series of straight rows all facing inward in three groupings, two on either side of a central aisle and one at the end facing the podium.

Examples and images: India's Lok Sabha, Australia's House of Representatives, National Assembly of South Africa, Legislative Assembly of Manitoba, New Zealand's House of Representatives

Hybrid style: Australia's House of Representatives seating plan. The speaker's chair is at the left, the Government is to the Speaker's right (party seats in blue), the Official Opposition to the Speaker's left (party seats in red).

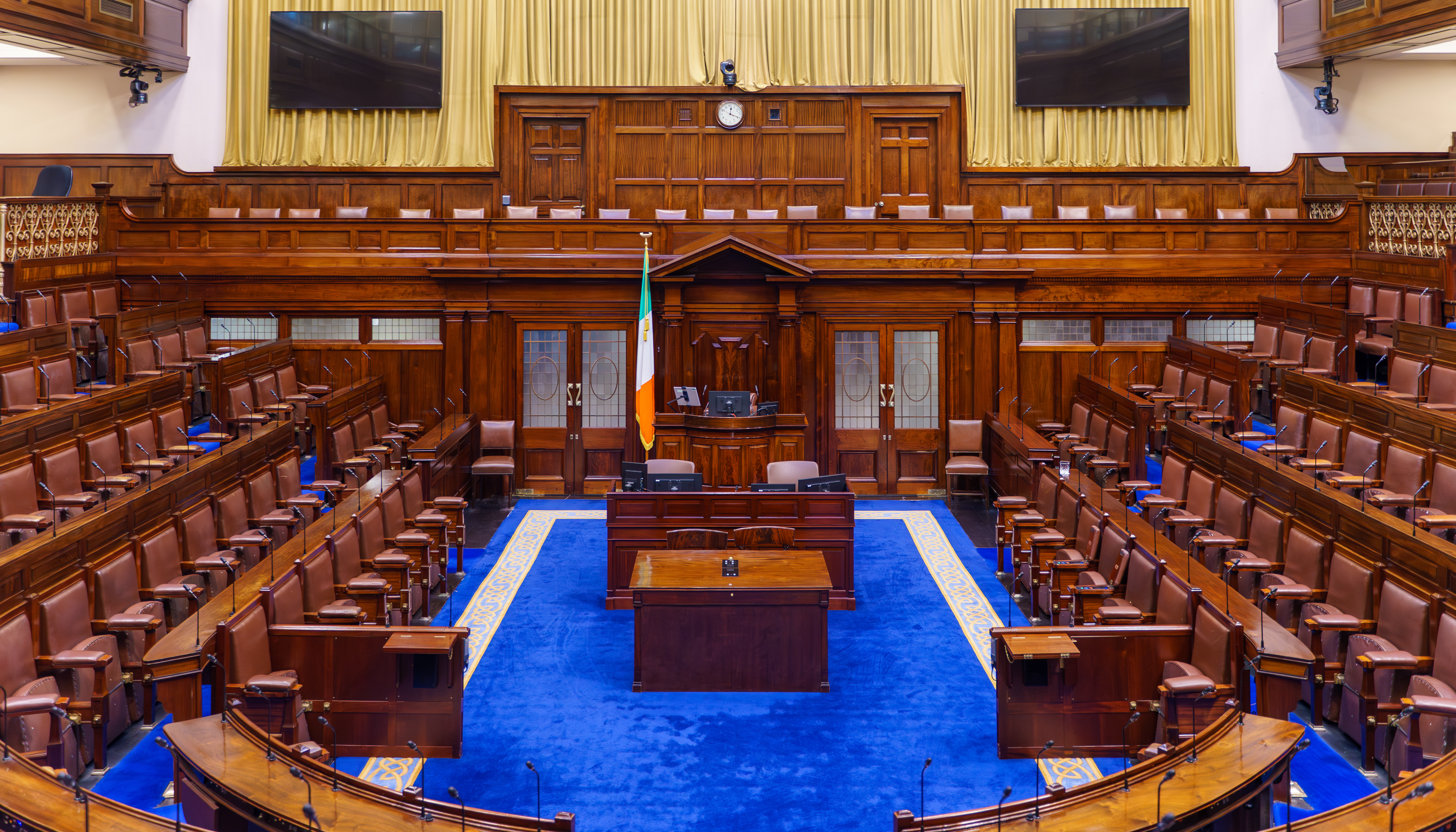
Ireland's Dáil Eireann

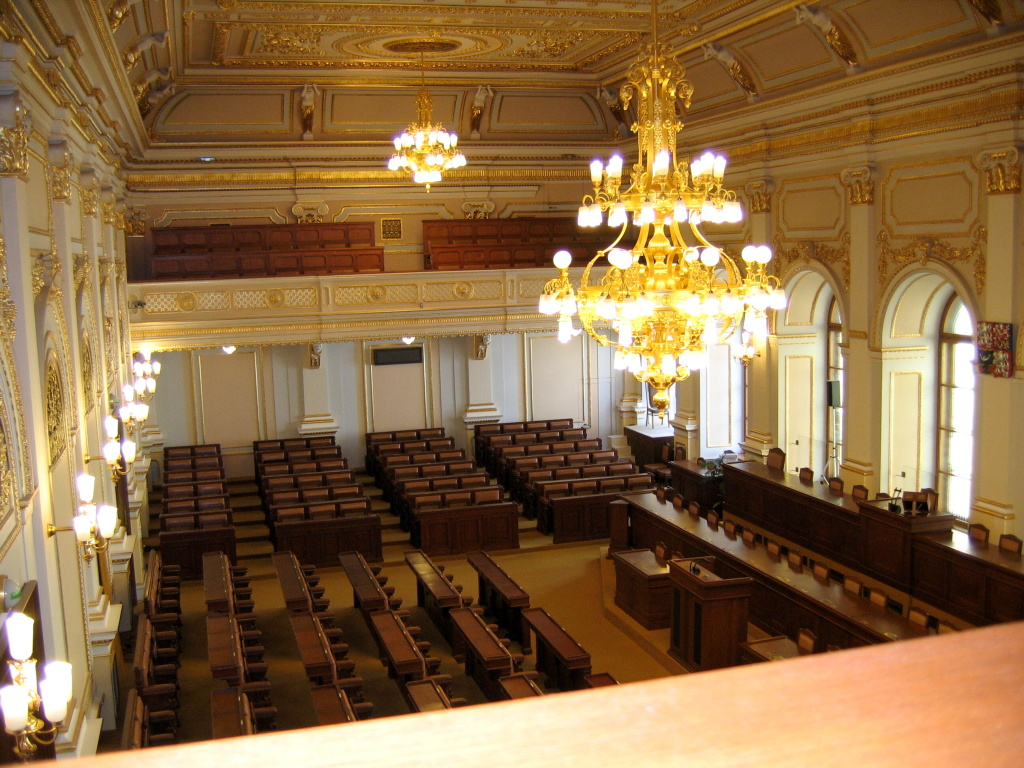
Czech Chamber of Deputies

=== Fan-shaped ===
The hemicycle or semi-circular seating configuration originated in late 18th century France when the post-revolutionary leaders selected the amphitheater form as one that would symbolize and foster unity, in contrast to the "impression of parliamentary fragmentation" of the British configuration. This configuration was soon emulated in other parts of Europe and in the United States Congress, the Capitol Building being designed by French architect Benjamin Latrobe. This adoption of the ancient Greek theater form coincided with the Greek Revival movements in architecture, including literal use of the symbology of the ancient democracy.

Its form allows for presentation by a single person, or small group, to speak or present to all members of the chamber on a face-to-face basis from a podium (or similar element) at the focal point of the room. The primary hierarchy of position is largely distance from the podium, and is not in a position of support or opposition. This position gives pride of place to the podium, is not inherently partisan, and if each member of the group is given the chance to address the group, everyone has a (theoretically) equal position.

Examples and images: France's National Assembly, U.S. House of Representatives, UN General Assembly, Parliament of Finland, Brazilian Chamber of Deputies, Scottish Parliament, German Bundestag, Riksdag of Sweden

Fan-shaped: National Assembly of France seating plan. The president of the assembly's dias is at the bottom (not shown)

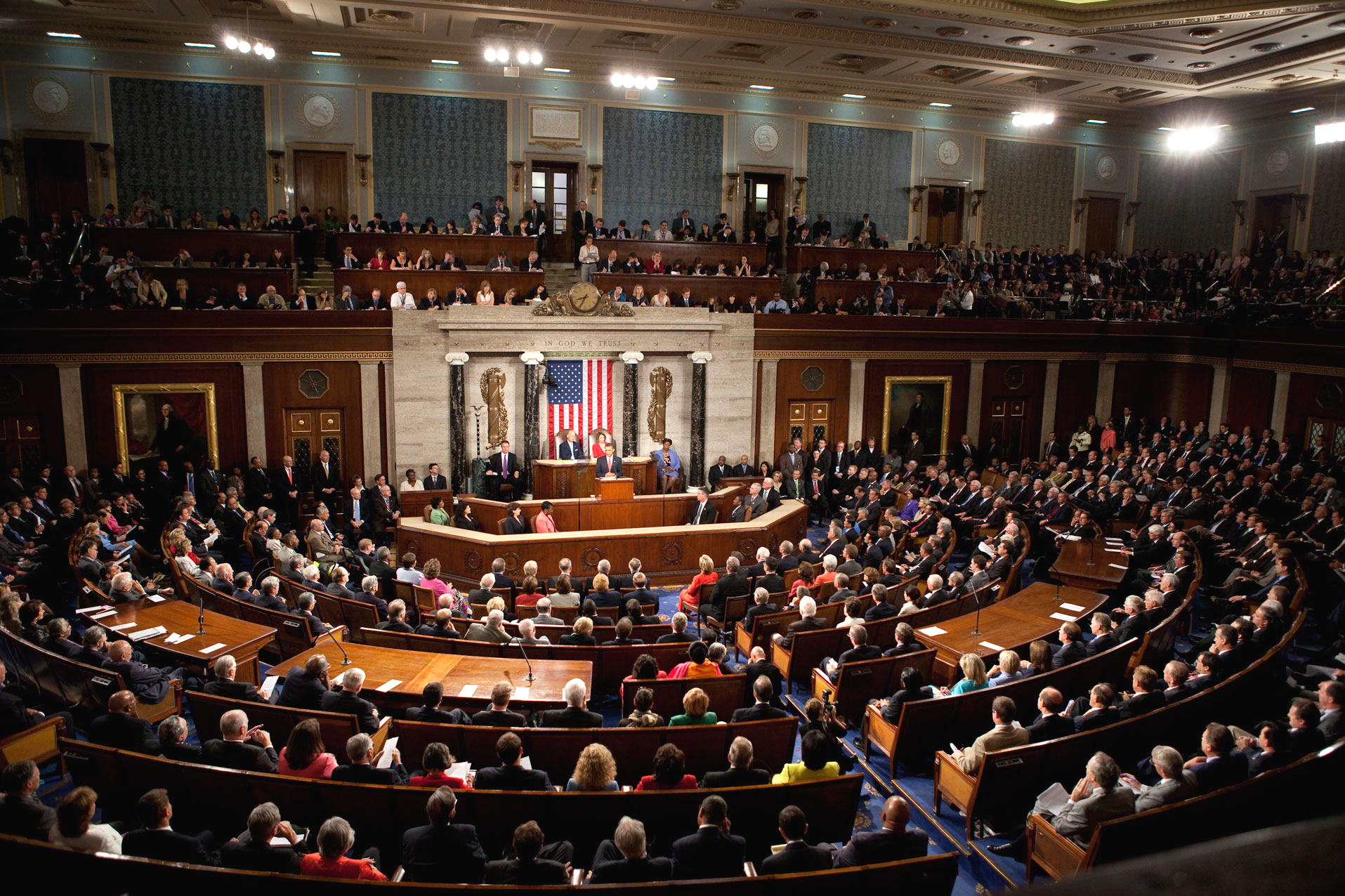
US House of Representatives with the President addressing a joint session of Congress

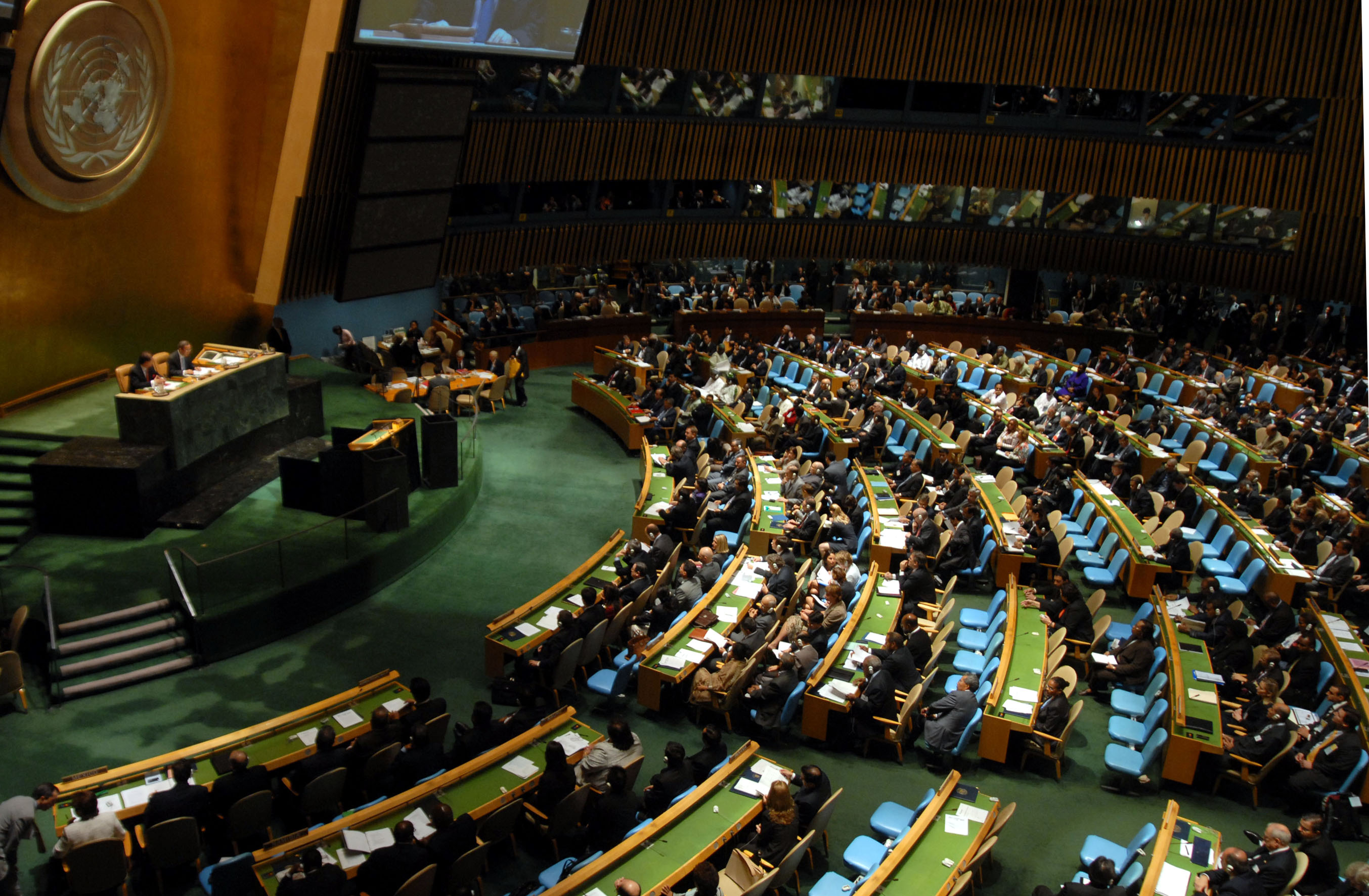
United Nations General Assembly Hall

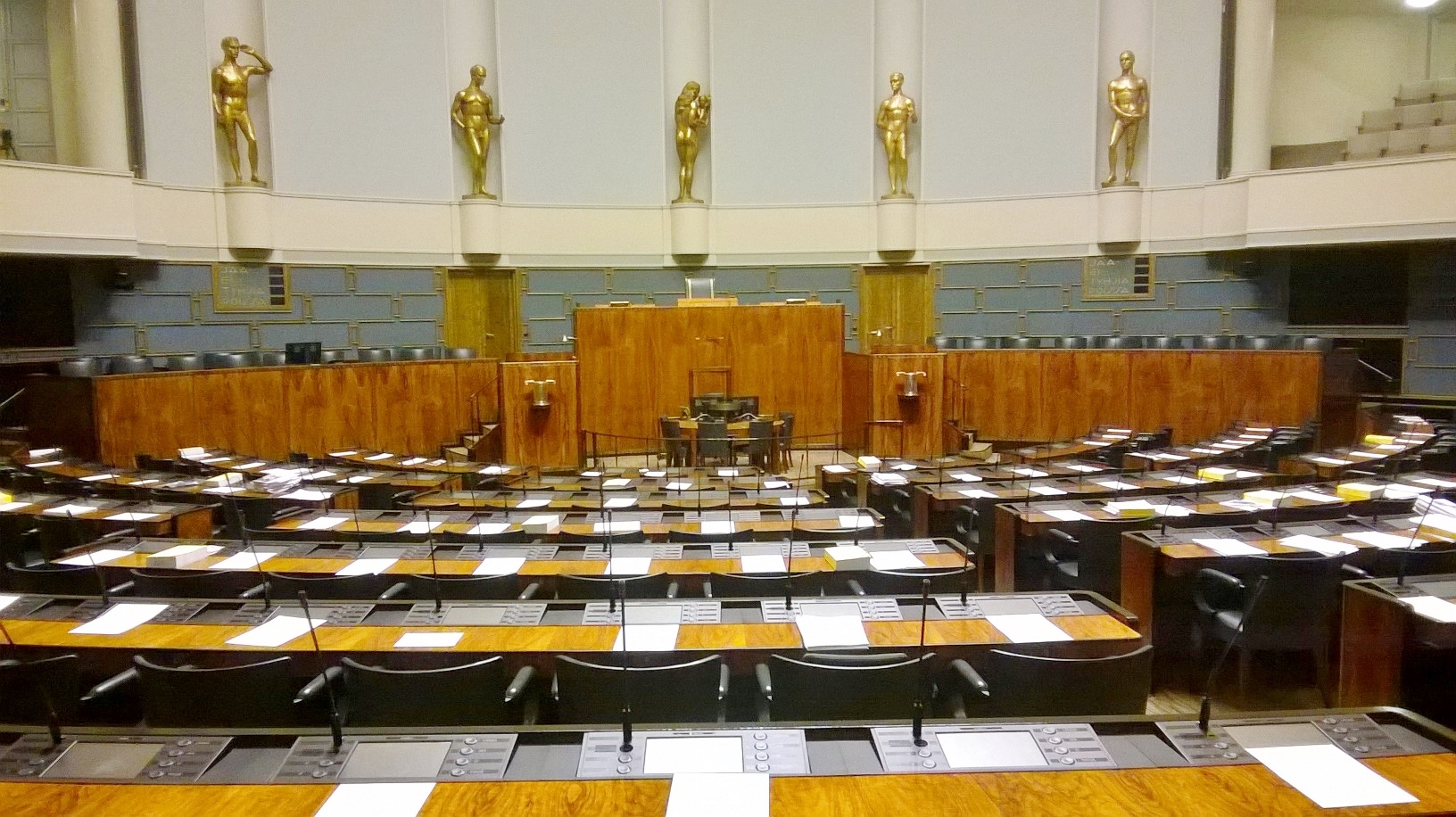
Finnish Parliament debating chamber

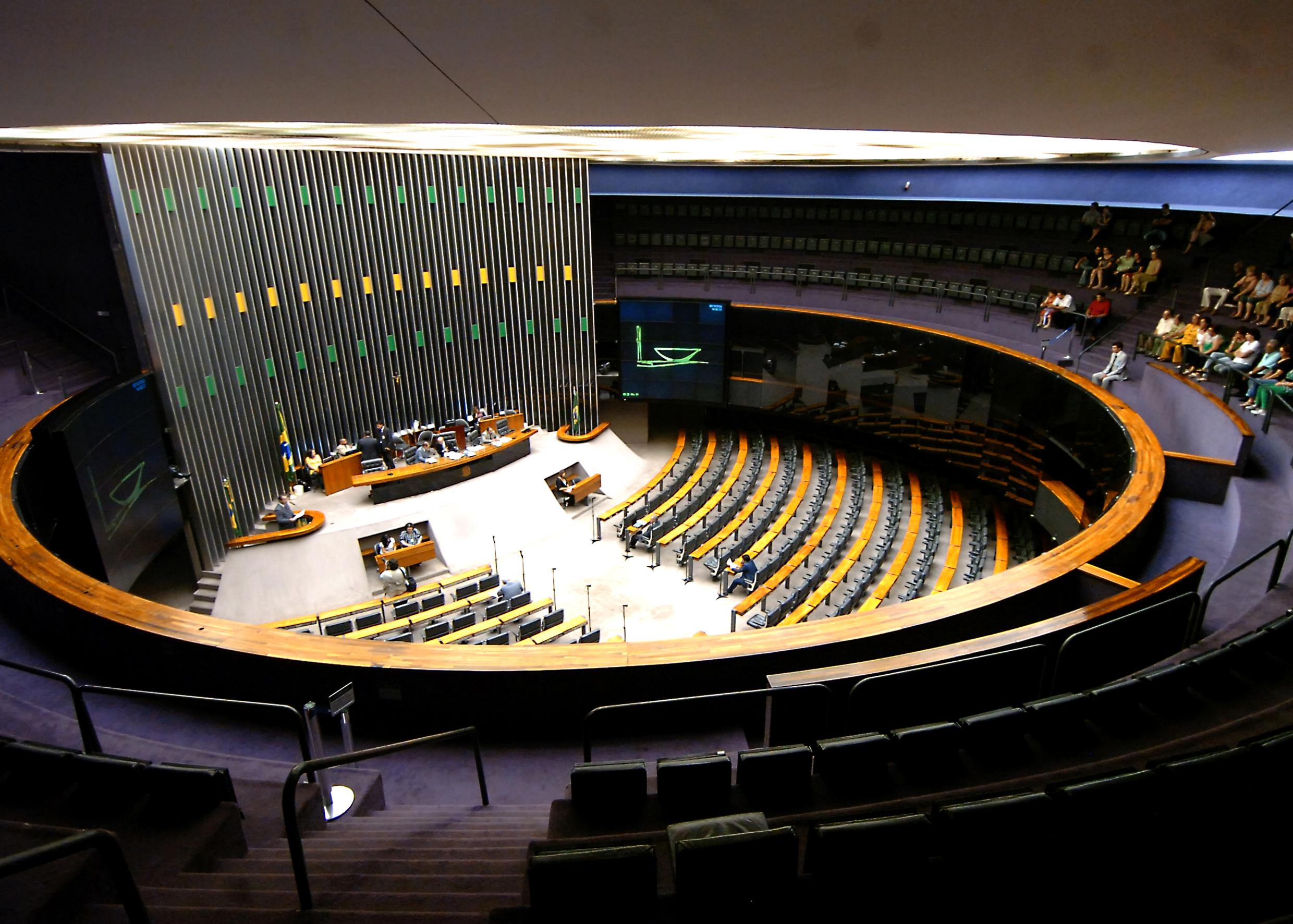
Debating chamber of the Chamber of Deputies of Brazil

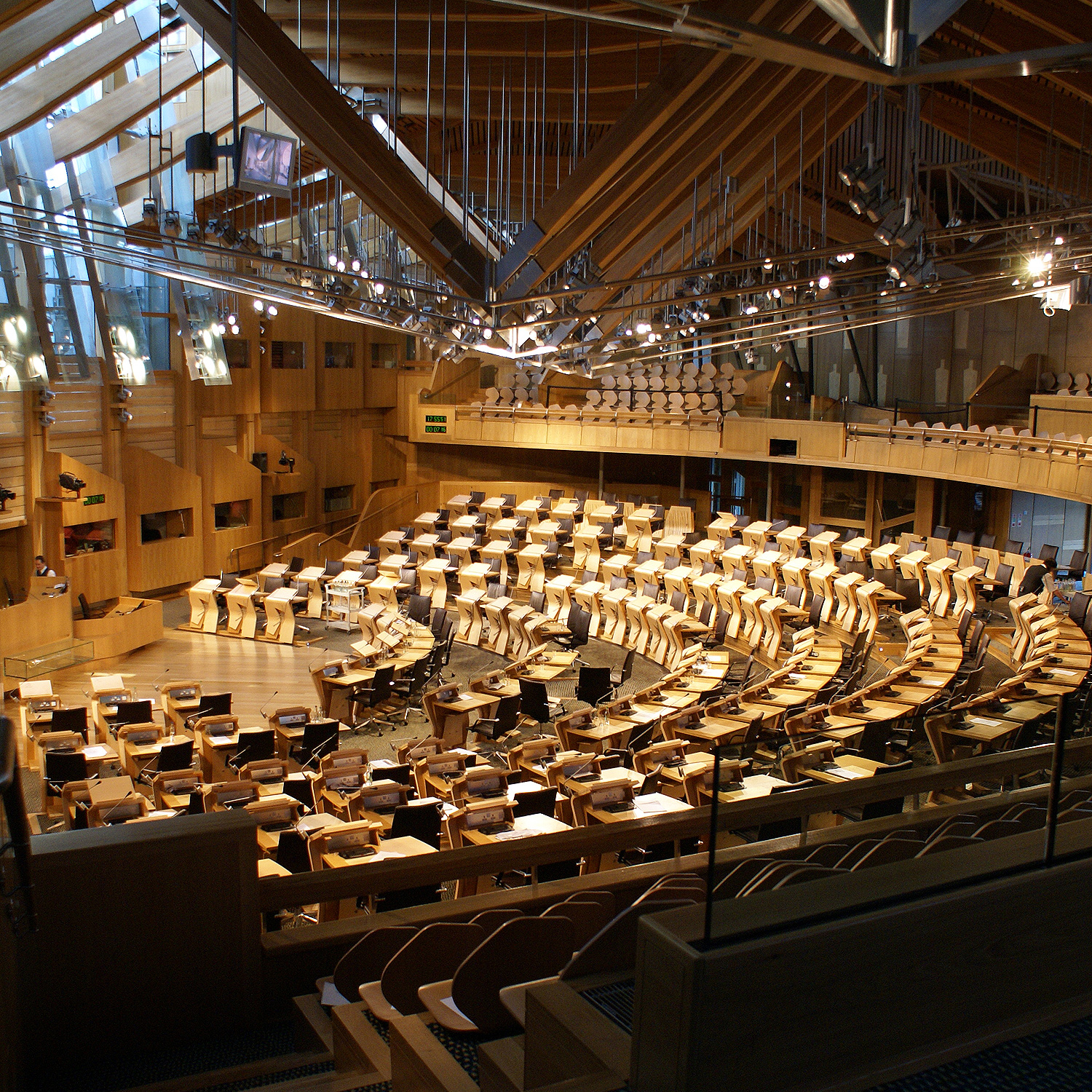
Scottish Parliament debating chamber

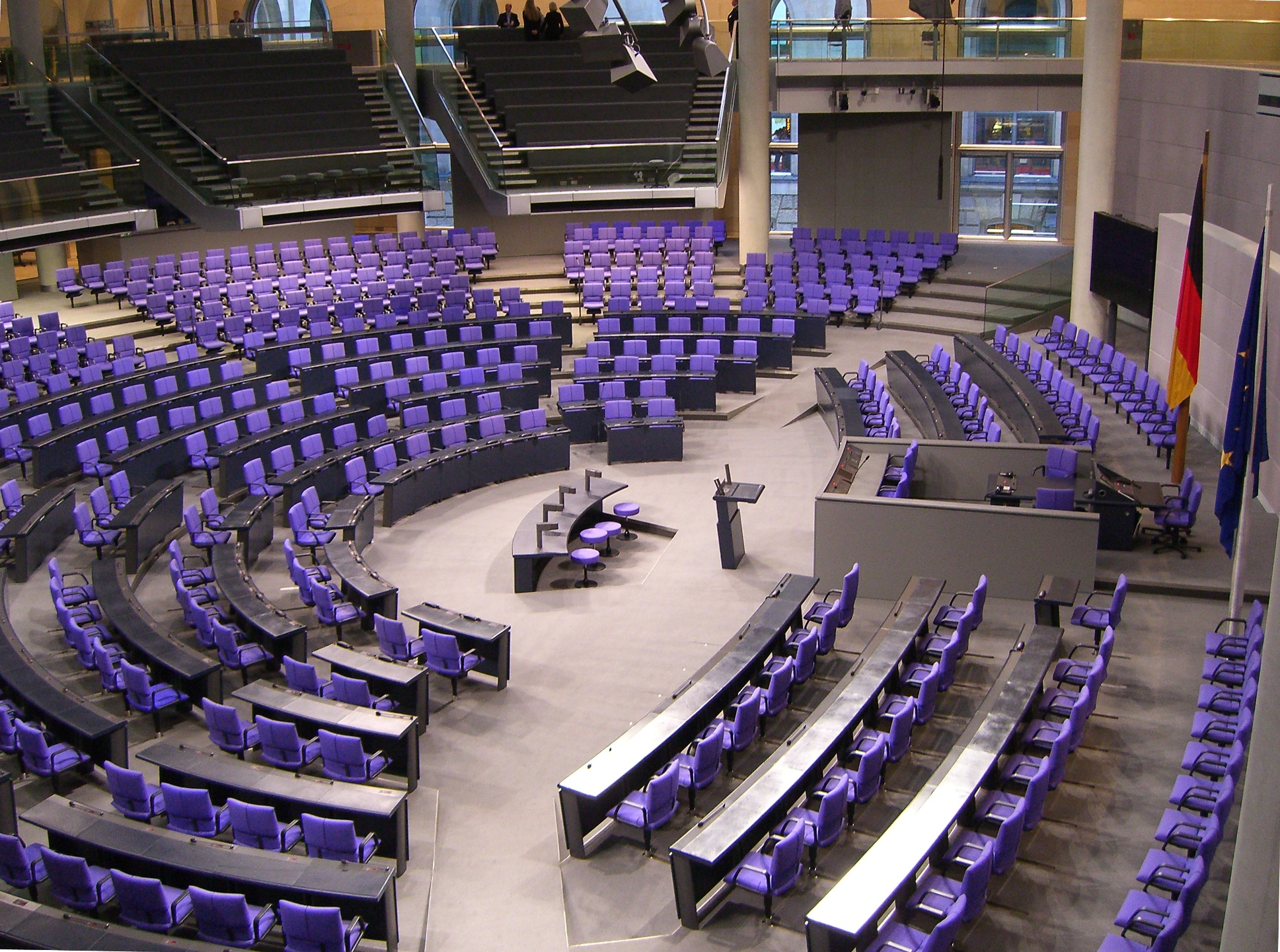
German Bundestag debating chamber

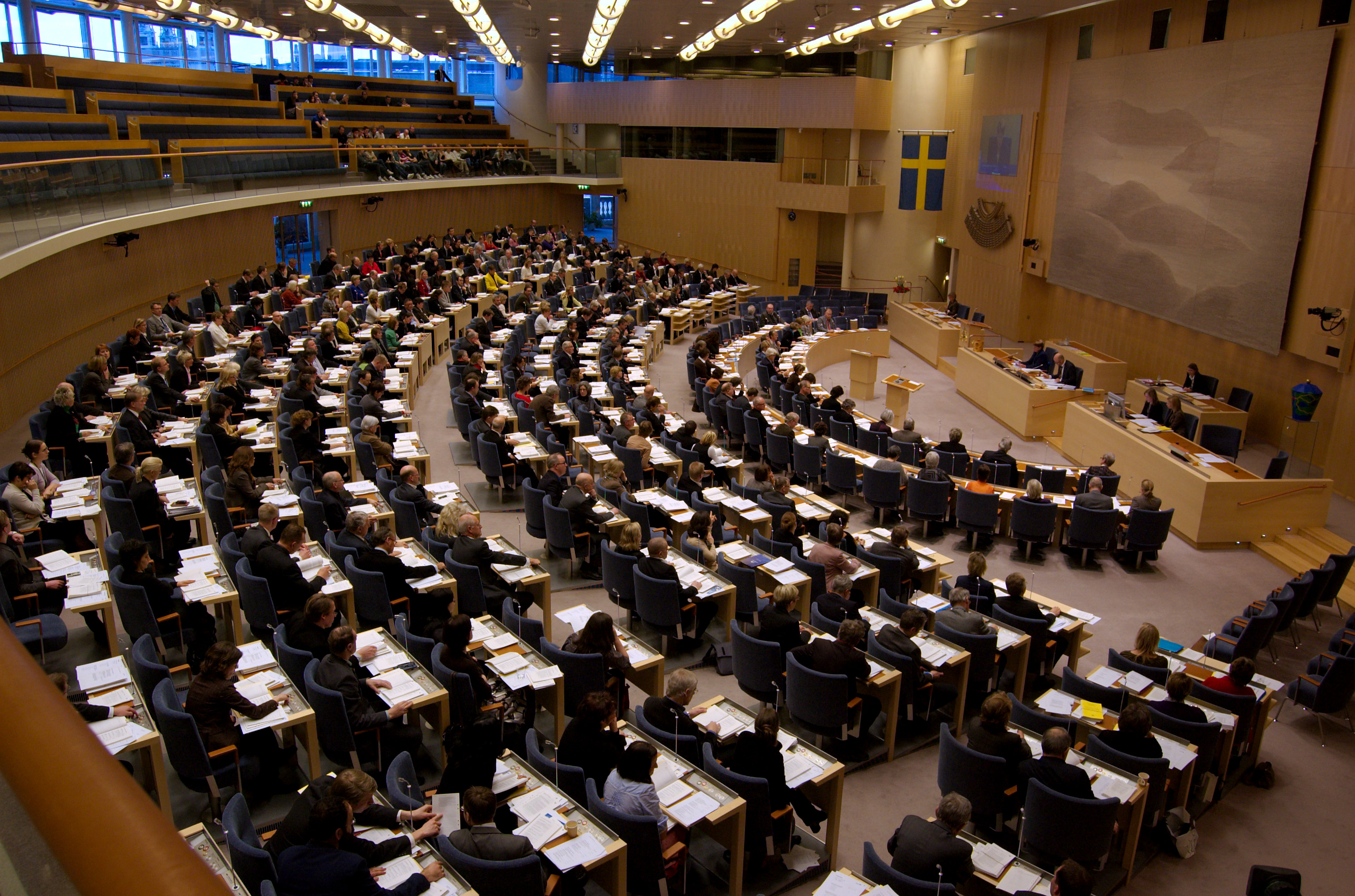
Debating chamber of the Swedish Riksdag

=== Circular ===
Circular seating configurations for places of discourse have been envisioned as early as the 12th Century story of the Knights of the Round Table. As with many later versions, this was intended to be a collaborative forum. In the late 1940s, facilities for the United Nations Security Council, a body formed during and immediately after World War II, were designed to support collaboration and avoid confrontation.

Since the early 1990s, several debating chambers have been constructed that support, or were designed to support, consensus-style or collaboration-style discourse and government. These include legislative assembly facilities for indigenous and non-indigenous peoples in Northern Canada, Great Britain, and Polynesia. Most are for bodies that do not involve formal political parties.

Examples and images: United Nations Security Council, Senedd of Wales, Wilp Si A'yuukhl Nisga'a), Legislative Assembly of Nunavut, Legislative Assembly of the Northwest Territories, meeting halls of the Society of Friends, National Parliament of the Solomon Islands.

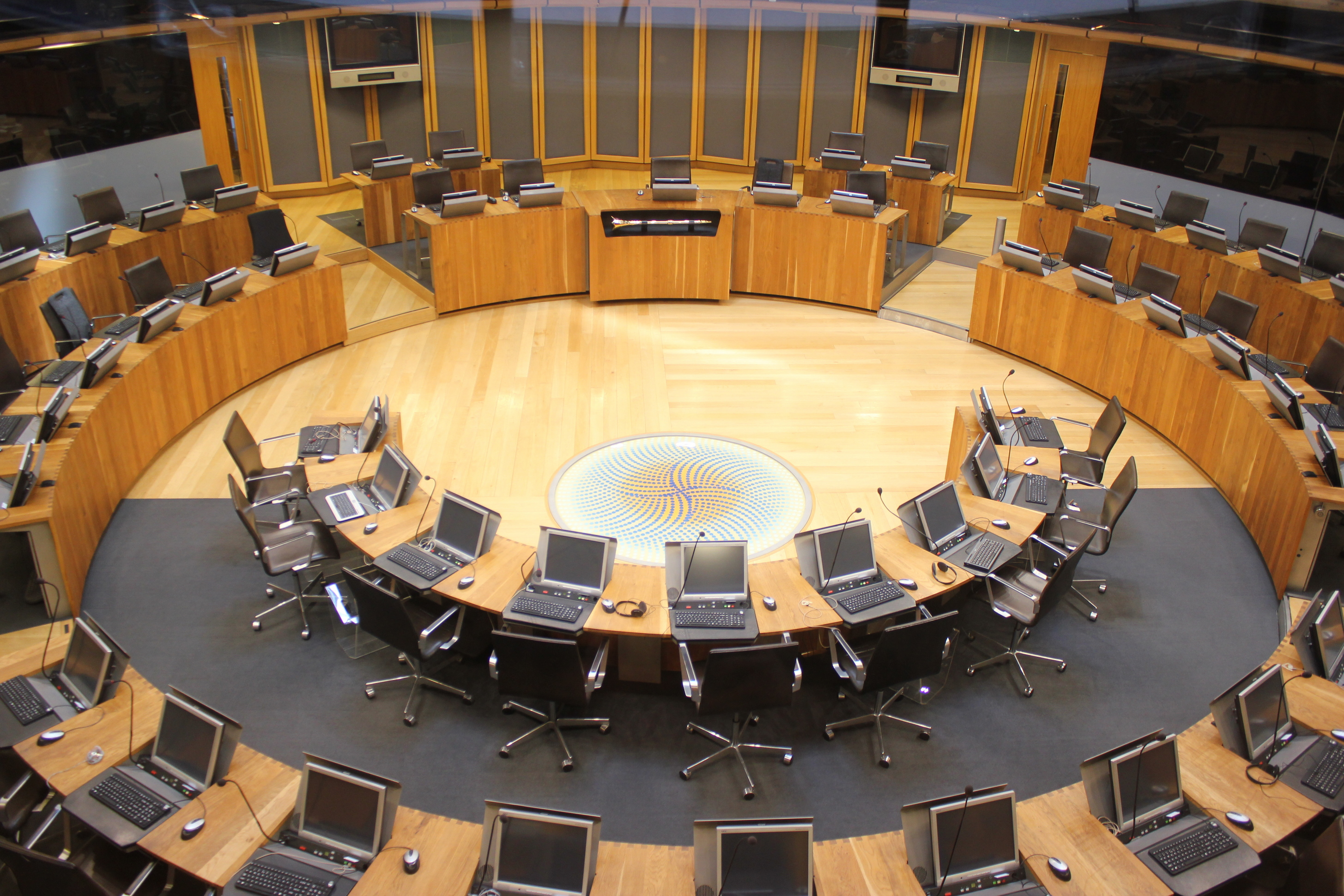
Debating Chamber of the Senedd of Wales

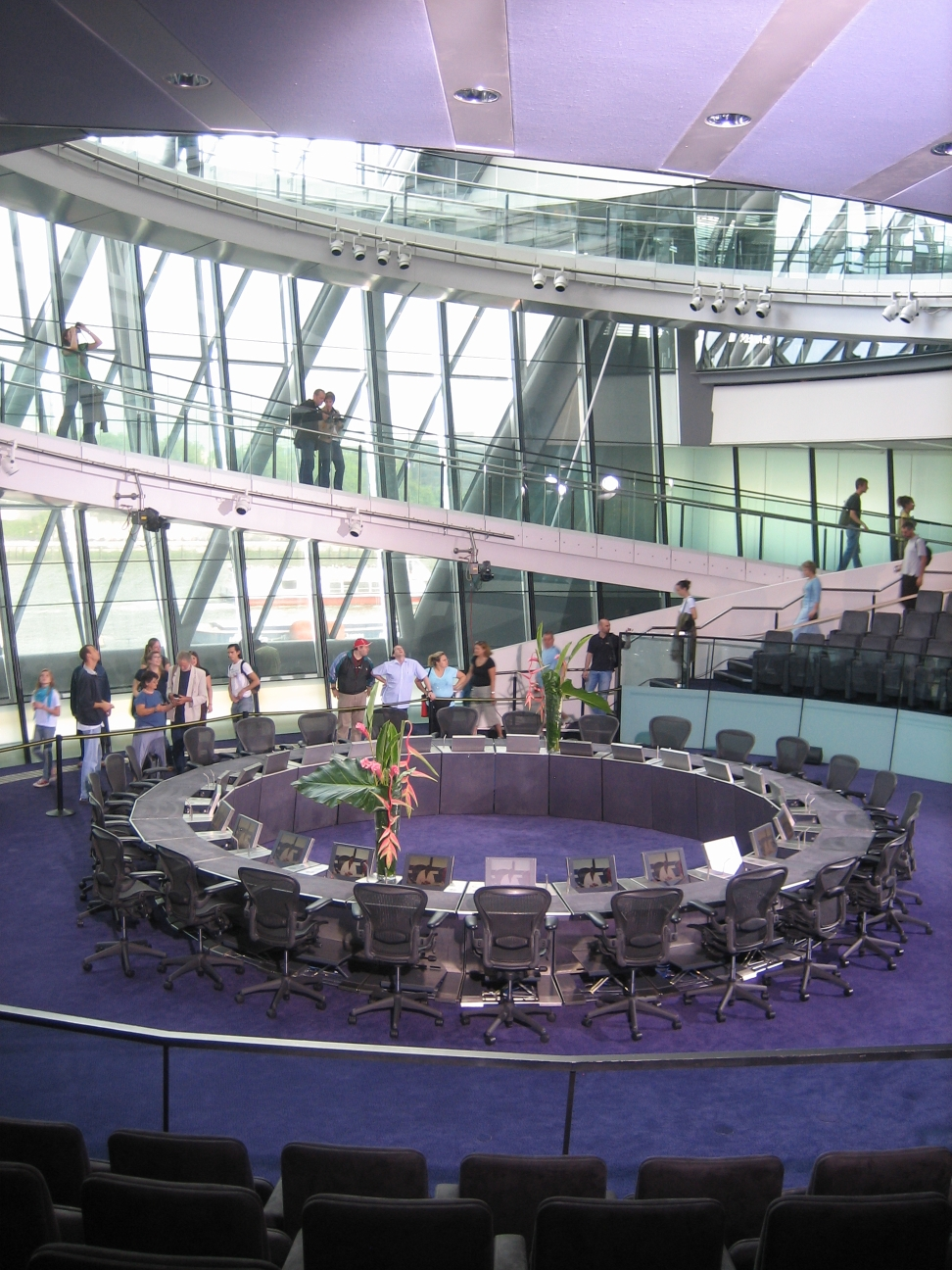
Chamber of City Hall, London (Southwark)

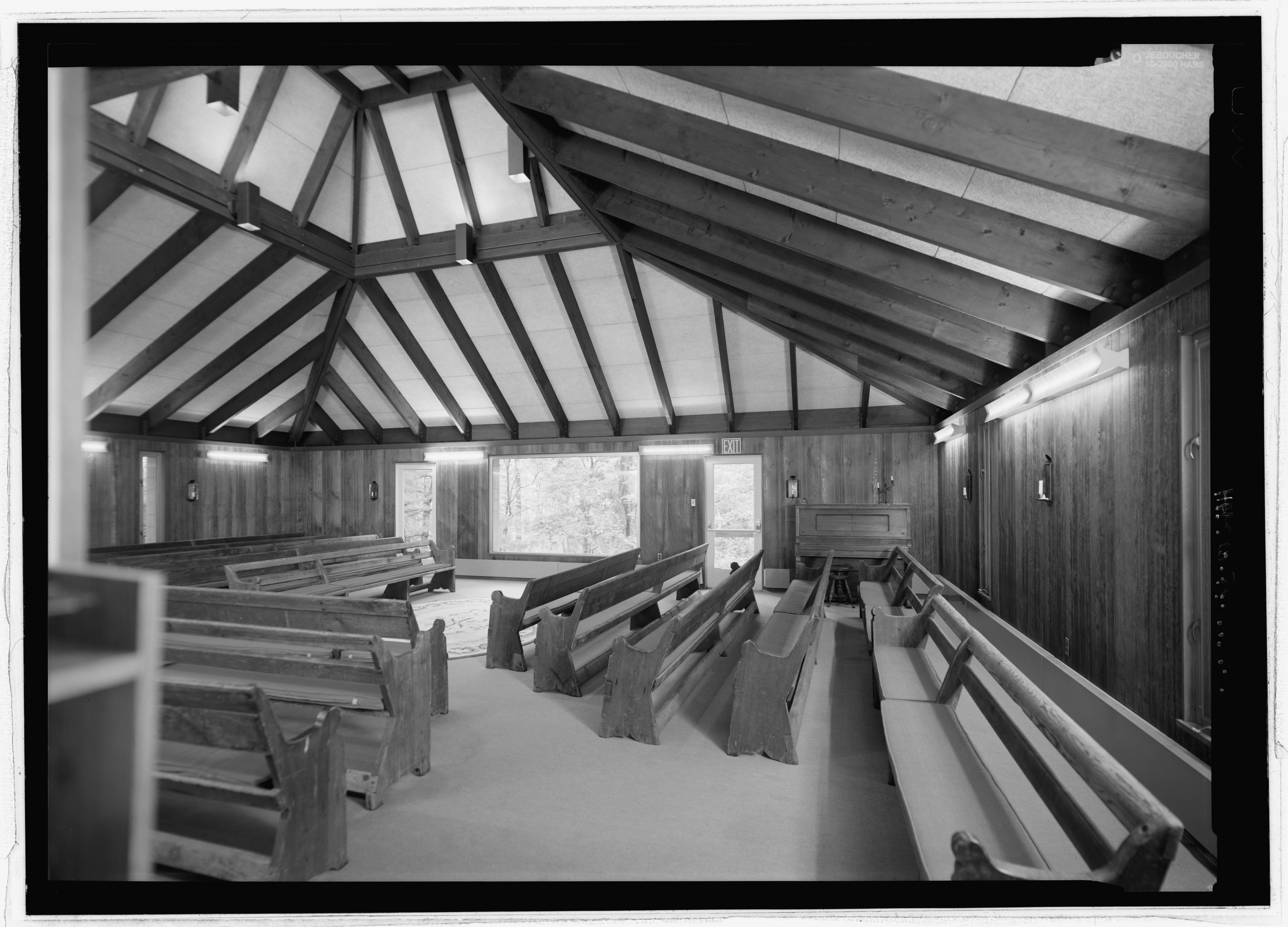
Society of Friends meeting house

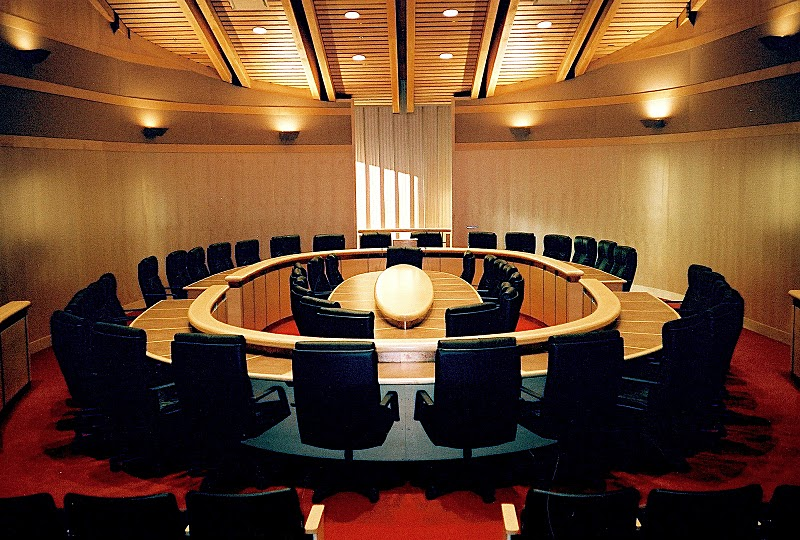
Nisga'a Lisims Government Chamber

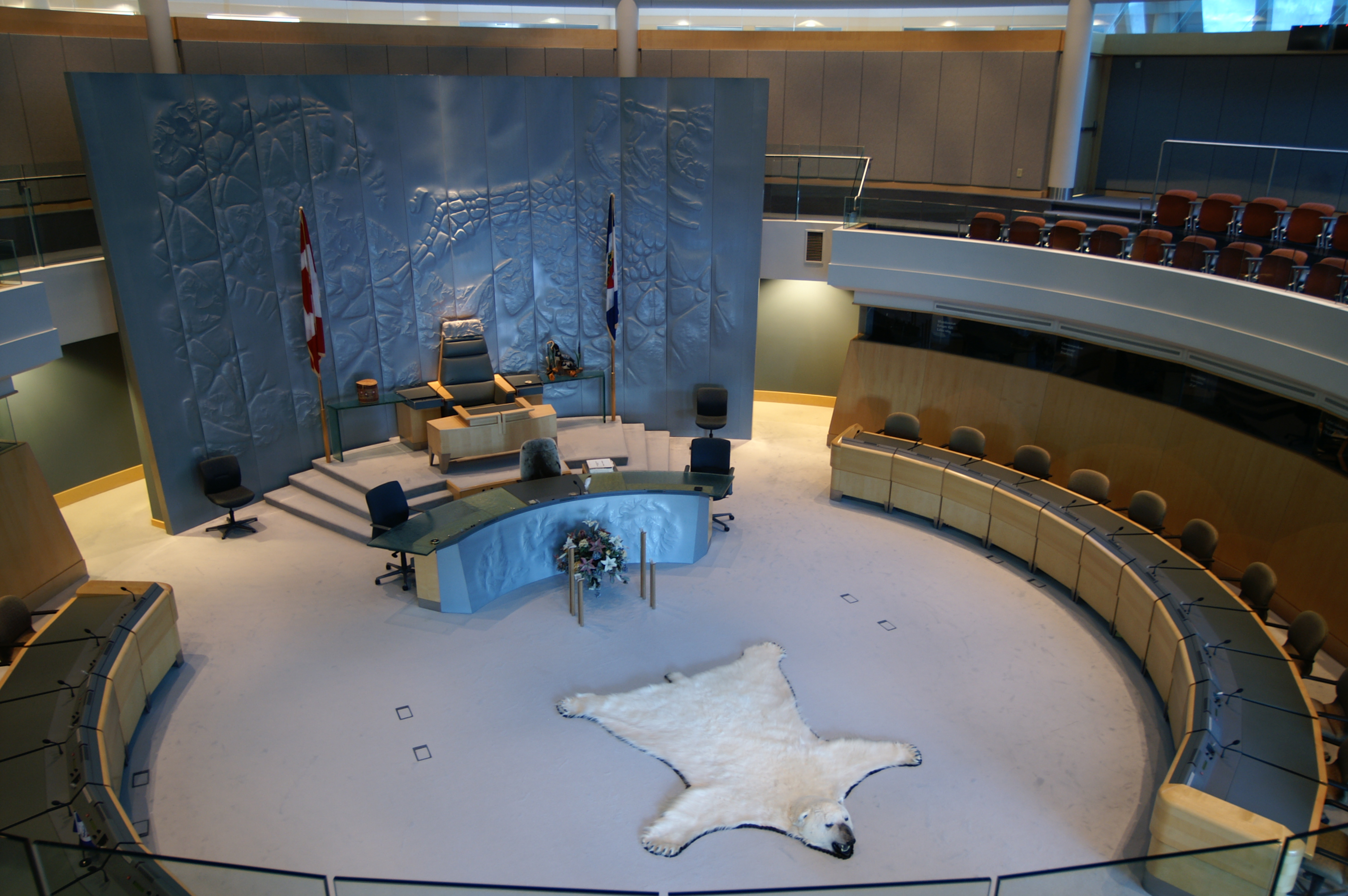
Chamber of the Northwest Territories Legislative Assembly

== Virtual ==
The introduction of regular live television broadcasts of legislative chambers, which began with the Canadian House of Commons in 1977, has influenced debate and extended the audience well beyond the physical location of the debate chamber. More recently this has developed into direct two-way communication in small and large meeting rooms (virtual events), and even through personal hand-held devices into nearly every corner of the world. This has both changed the nature of the physical nature of the debating environment into a digital and virtual one, and in a non-literal sense into a series of ever-changing and highly varied configuration and collection of spaces determined by where each debate participant happens to be located. This may also have the added effect of drawing others into the debate, whether as passive observers or active participants, unwittingly, uninvited, or by active invitation of a single participant. For those meetings or debates who remain grounded in a structured location, such as a conference room or legislative chamber who connect to one or several remote participants via video-conferencing, the configuration of the room may be re-focused onto the video screen and away from those in the room.

== Notes and references ==
- Manow, Philip: In the King's Shadow. Polity, 2010. ISBN 0745647677.
