= Speaker of the Legislative Assembly =

Speaker of the Legislative Assembly is a title commonly held by presiding officers of parliamentary bodies styled legislative assemblies. The office is most widely used in state and territorial legislatures in Australia, and in provincial and territorial legislatures in Canada.

Examples follow.

== Australia ==
- Speaker of the Australian Capital Territory Legislative Assembly
- Speaker of the New South Wales Legislative Assembly
- Speaker of the Northern Territory Legislative Assembly
- Speaker of the Legislative Assembly of Queensland
- Speaker of the Victorian Legislative Assembly
- Speaker of the Western Australian Legislative Assembly

== Canada ==
- Speaker of the Legislative Assembly of Alberta
- Speaker of the Legislative Assembly of British Columbia
- Speaker of the Legislative Assembly of Manitoba
- Speaker of the Legislative Assembly of Northwest Territories
- Speaker of the Legislative Assembly of Nunavut
- Speaker of the Legislative Assembly of Ontario
- Speaker of the Legislative Assembly of Prince Edward Island
- Speaker of the Legislative Assembly of Saskatchewan
- Speaker of the Legislative Assembly of New Brunswick
- Speaker of the Yukon Legislative Assembly

== Falkland Islands ==
- Speaker of the Legislative Assembly of the Falkland Islands

== India ==
- See Speaker (India)

== See also ==
- President of the Legislative Assembly (disambiguation)
- Speaker of the House of Assembly (disambiguation)
- President of the National Assembly of Quebec
