= Federation Council =

Federation Council may refer to:

- Federation Council (Russia), the upper house of the Federal Assembly of Russia
- Federation Council of the Soviet Union (1990–1991), an advisory government body in the USSR
- Federation Council (Yugoslavia) (1963–1974), an advisory body of the Socialist Federal Republic of Yugoslavia
- Federation Council (Star Trek), an organization in the fictional Star Trek universe
- Federation Council (Iraq), the de jure upper house of the Iraqi parliament
- Federation Council (New South Wales), a local government area in Australia

== See also ==
- Council of the Federation, an organization made up of the premiers of Canada's thirteen provinces and territories
- Federal Council (disambiguation), a list of organizations named "Federal Council"
