= Federation Council (Yugoslavia) =

Former advisory body of Yugoslavia

The Federation Council was an advisory body of the Socialist Federal Republic of Yugoslavia, dealing with issues of general policy.

== Description ==
The Federation Council was established by the Constitution of the SFRY in 1963. Council sessions were held at the initiative of SFRY president Josip Broz Tito, and after his death, by the president of the Presidency. The council's activities were detailed in the 1974 Yugoslav Constitution, adopted following the political crisis in the country.

The composition of the Federation Council was determined by decisions of the Federal Assembly of the SFRY and the Assemblies of the Republics and Autonomous Provinces. The Presidency could only propose the appointment or dismissal of a member. The Federation Council included prominent public and political figures, officials at the republican or federal level, or heads of other important organizations. People's Heroes of Yugoslavia often served on the council. The Federation Council was convened to address matters of general policy at the suggestion of the president of the SFRY, and later, the Presidency of the SFRY. The convener could assign specific tasks to a member of the Federation Council.

== See also ==
- Federation Council (disambiguation)
