= Executive Council =

Executive Council may refer to:

== Government ==
- Executive council system, a political system in which executive power is shared by a collegial body
- Executive Council, part of the executive branch of the government of Anguilla; see Politics of Anguilla
- Executive Council (Commonwealth countries), a constitutional organ that exercises executive power and advises the governor, including:
  - Executive Council of New Zealand, formed by ministers and others under the governor-general
  - Federal Executive Council (Australia)
    - Executive Council of New South Wales, the cabinet of New South Wales, consisting of the Ministers, presided over by the Governor of NSW
  - Federal Executive Council (Nigeria)
- Executive Council (South Africa), the name of the cabinet in the governments of South African provinces
- Executive Council of Abu Dhabi, the local executive authority of the Emirate of Abu Dhabi
- Executive Council of Bern, the government of the Swiss canton of Bern
- Executive Council of Catalonia, the government of the Spanish autonomous community of Catalonia
- Executive Council of Hong Kong, a council that advises and assists the Chief Executive of Hong Kong
- Executive Council of Macau, a council that advises and assists the Chief Executive of Macau
- Executive Council of New Hampshire, an executive body of the US state of New Hampshire
- Executive Council of the African Union, a council of ministers designated by the governments of member countries
- Executive Council of the Irish Free State, cabinet and de facto executive branch of government of the 1922–1937 Irish Free State
- Executive Council of the Straits Settlements (c. 1877), replaced Executive Council of Singapore
- Executive Council of Vojvodina, the government of the Serbian province of Vojvodina
- Federal Executive Council (Yugoslavia)
- Massachusetts Governor's Council, an executive body of the US state of Massachusetts
- Viceroy's Executive Council, an advisory body during the time of British rule in India

== Other fields ==
- Alberta College and Technical Institute Student Executive Council, a coalition of college and technical institute students' associations
- Stock Exchange Executive Council, a financial regulation council in the People's Republic of China
- Executive Council, the governing body of the Ghana Football Association

== See also ==
- Federal Council (disambiguation)
- Council of Ministers
  - Council of Ministers (India)
- Council of State
