= Speaker (politics) =

Presiding officer of a legislative body

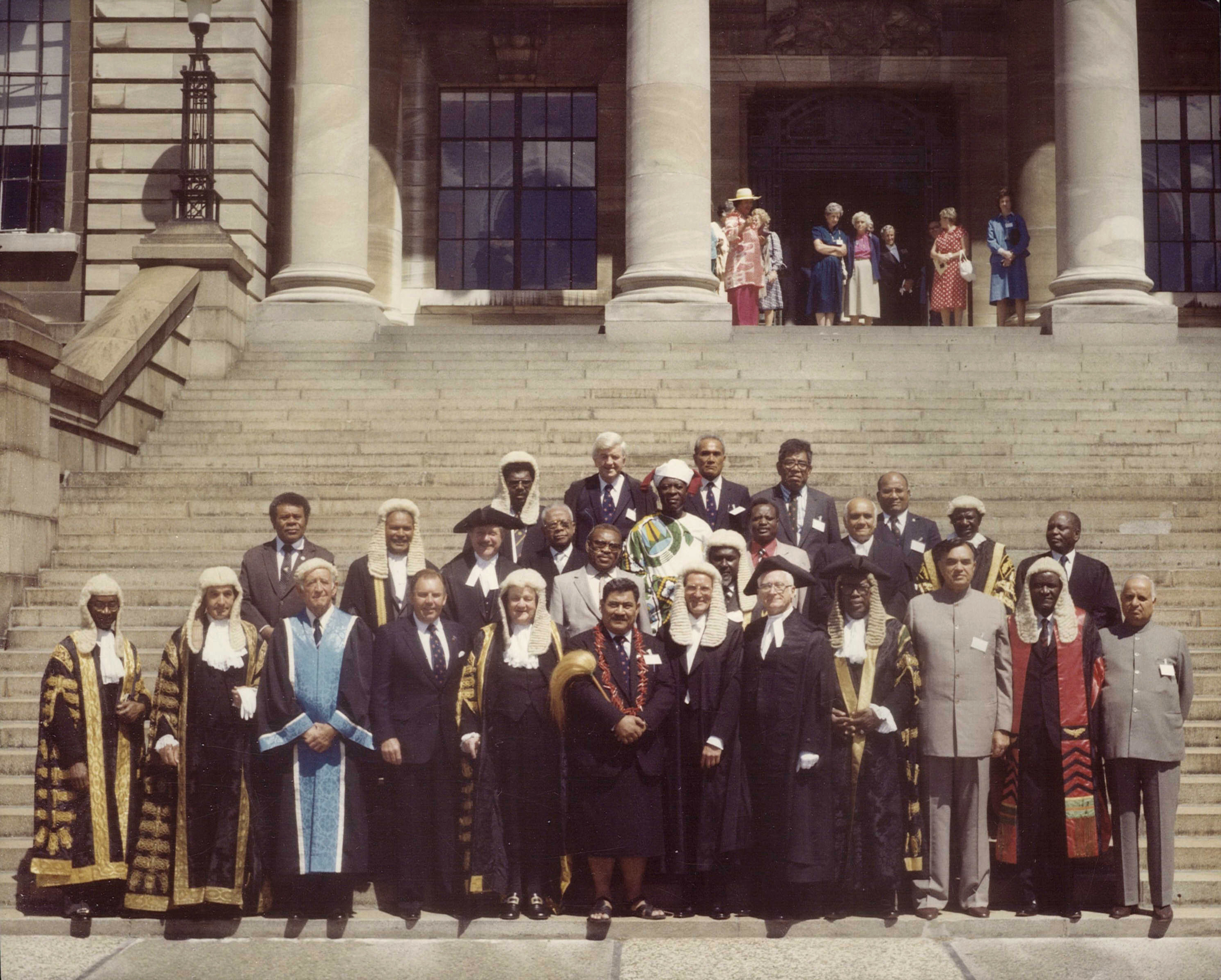
Speakers and presiding officers from various Commonwealth nations meet for a Commonwealth Speakers and Presiding Officers Conference in Wellington, New Zealand, 1984

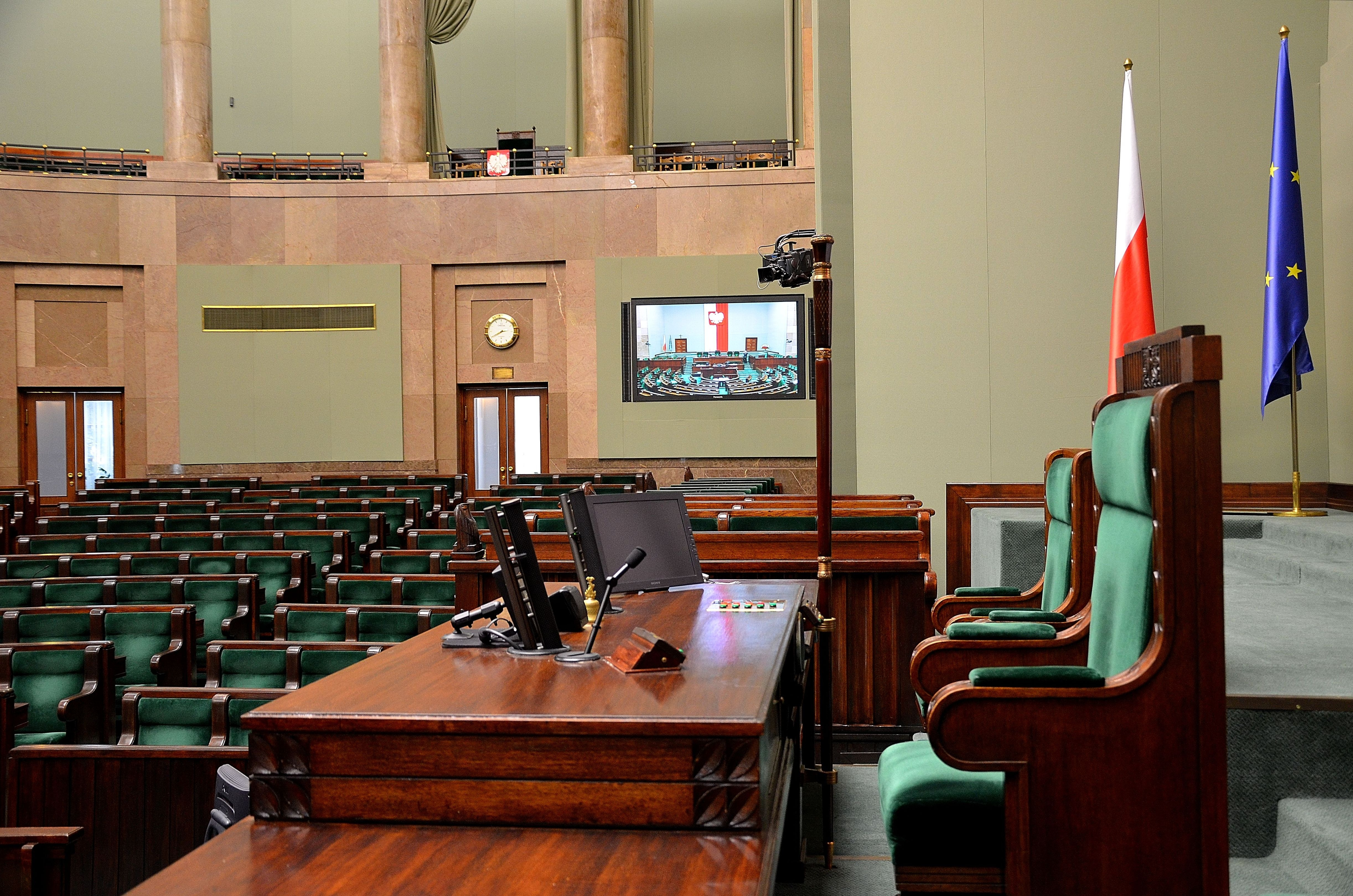
Marshal's chair in the Sejm, lower chamber of the Polish Parliament

The speaker or president of a deliberative assembly, especially a legislative body, is its presiding officer. The title of speaker is first documented in 1377 in England.

== Usage ==
The title was first recorded in 1377 to describe the role of Thomas de Hungerford in the Parliament of England.

The speaker's official role is to moderate debate, rule on procedure, announce vote results, and the like. The speaker decides who may speak and has the powers to discipline members who break the procedures of the chamber or house. When members speak, they address their remarks through the speaker, and only address them directly whilst referring to other members in the third person. The speaker often also represents the body in person, as the voice of the body in ceremonial and some other situations.

A speaker usually presides over the lower house. Different styles are employed to refer to those who preside over upper houses or Senates.

By convention, speakers are normally addressed in Parliament as "Mister Speaker" if a man, or "Madam Speaker" if a woman. In other cultures, other styles are used, mainly being equivalents of English "chairman" or "president". Many bodies also have a speaker pro tempore (or deputy speaker), designated to fill in when the speaker is not available.

The speaker is commonly supported by a "speaker's office".

Examples of speakers include:

=== Armenia ===
The president of the National Assembly of Armenia is the speaker of the house in the National Assembly of Armenia. The formation of this position was established on 1 August 1918.

=== Australia ===
The speaker of the House of Representatives is the presiding officer of the Australian House of Representatives, the lower house of the Parliament of Australia. The speaker is elected by the House of Representatives from its membership and holds no ordinary vote but exercises a casting vote in the event of a tie. The basic duties of the speaker are outlined in the federal constitution. The speaker is expected to be impartial in their duties, but the position is regarded as a political appointment and the speaker has almost always been a member of the majority party in the House of Representatives. The largely equivalent role in the upper house of parliament is the president of the Senate and the two share administrative duties with respect to the operations of Parliament House.

=== Brazil ===
==== Federal ====
The Federal Constitution determines that both houses of the National Congress, in the first session after taking office, must elect their "Mesas Diretoras" (Presiding Boards), consisting each of a president, two vice presidents, four secretaries and alternates to serve two-year terms, with no reappointment to the same position in the immediately subsequent election. In addition to voting as senator or federal deputy at their respective houses, both presidents also hold the casting vote in case of a tie, but the large number of legislators (81 in the Federal Senate and 513 in the Chamber of Deputies, as of 2023) makes this attribution rarely used.

The president of the Federal Senate is the presiding officer of the Federal Senate, the upper house. The president of the Chamber of Deputies is the presiding officer of the Chamber of Deputies, the lower house. The Constitution also determines that the president of the Federal Senate presides over the Board of the National Congress in the joint sessions of both houses, the Common Regulations of the National Congress refer to the president of the Federal Senate on these occasions as "President of the National Congress". (Note: Under the old republican constitutions, the vice president of the Republic was, cumulatively, President of the Federal Senate (and of the National Congress). However, the senators could elect a substitute president in the event of a vacancy of the vice presidency.)

==== States ====
Following the Brazilian political tradition, the legislative assemblies of the states (Legislative Chamber in the case of the Federal District), all unicameral, adopt rules identical to those of the National Congress, electing a Presiding Board among the state deputies for two-year terms on the first session after taking office.

=== Canada ===
==== Federal ====
In Canada, the speaker of the House of Commons (Président de la Chambre des communes) is the individual elected to preside over the House of Commons, the elected lower house. The speaker is a member of parliament (MP) and is elected at the beginning of each new parliament by fellow MPs. The speaker's role in presiding over the House of Commons is similar to that of speakers elsewhere in other countries that use the Westminster system. The speaker does not vote except in the case of a tie. By convention, if required to vote, the speaker will vote in favour of continuing debate on a matter, but will not ultimately vote for a measure to be approved.

The speaker of the Senate (président du Sénat) is the presiding officer of the Senate, the appointed upper house. The speaker represents the Senate at official functions, rules on questions of parliamentary procedure and parliamentary privilege, and presides over debates and voting in the "Red Chamber". The speaker of the Senate is appointed by the governor general from amongst sitting senators upon the advice of the prime minister. The speaker has a vote on all matters. In the event of a tie, the matter fails.

==== Provinces ====
At the provincial level, the presiding officer of the provincial legislatures is called the "speaker" (président) in all provinces except Quebec, where the term "president" is used. The presiding officer fulfills the same role as the speaker of the House of Commons.

=== Chile ===
The president of the Chamber of Deputies is the highest authority of the Chamber of Deputies. The president of the Senate is the highest authority of the Senate of Chile.

=== People's Republic of China ===
In China, the National People's Congress and the Standing Committee of the National People's Congress exercise the legislative power of the State. When the National People's Congress holds its sessions, it shall elect a Presidium to preside over the sessions. The Chairman of the Standing Committee of the National People's Congress presides over the work of the Standing Committee of the National People's Congress.

Where the offices of the President and the Vice President of the People's Republic of China are both vacant, the National People's Congress shall elect their successors. Before such election, the Chairman of the Standing Committee of the National People's Congress shall temporarily act as President.

==== Hong Kong, China ====
The president of the Legislative Council of Hong Kong is the speaker of the Legislative Council and is elected by and from its members. The president presides over the council meetings and is empowered to enforce the Rules of Procedures solely.

While members of the Legislative Council may be Hong Kong residents who are not Chinese citizens, the president can only be selected from people with Chinese nationality who do not have a right of abode in foreign countries.

=== Italy ===
Parliamentarism in Italy is centred on the presidents of the two Houses, vested in defence of the members and of the assembly as a whole; (Note: Mancini and Galeotti believed that "in the enclosure of the House the exercise of presidential power should not be limits or obstacles whatsoever".) so "the Speaker invites the representative of the Government not to deviate from the rules of parliamentary behaviour". Now constitutional community highlights changes also in this role. The president of the Senate also acts as deputy president of the republic "in all cases in which the president cannot perform them".

=== India ===
In India, the speaker of the Lok Sabha is the presiding officer of the Lok Sabha, and is elected by the MPs from that chamber.

The chairman of the Rajya Sabha is the presiding officer of the Rajya Sabha, and similarly to the U.S. Vice President presiding over the U.S. Senate in the United States, the role is filled by the vice president of India. Unlike the Lok Sabha, the chairman is not elected by the Rajya Sabha MPs.

=== New Zealand ===
In New Zealand, the speaker of the House of Representatives is the presiding officer of the New Zealand House of Representatives, the only chamber of the New Zealand Parliament. Precedent set by other Westminster-style parliaments means that members of Parliament must always address the speaker.

=== Singapore ===
In Singapore, the speaker of the Parliament of Singapore is the head officer of the country's legislature. By recent tradition, the prime minister nominates a person, who may or may not be an elected member of parliament (MP), for the role. The person's name is then proposed and seconded by the MPs, before being elected as speaker. The Constitution states that Parliament has the freedom to decide how to elect its speaker.

While the speaker does not have to be an elected MP, they must possess the qualifications to stand for election as an MP as provided for in the Constitution. The speaker also cannot be a cabinet minister or parliamentary secretary, and must resign from those positions prior to being elected as speaker.

The speaker is one of the few public sector roles which allow its office-holder to automatically qualify as a candidate in the Singapore presidential elections.

=== Spain ===
The president of the Congress of Deputies is the speaker of the Congress of Deputies, the lower house of the Cortes Generales (the Spanish parliament). The president is elected among the members of the Congress and is, after the king and the prime minister, the highest authority in the Kingdom of Spain.

The president of the Senate is the speaker of the Spanish upper house called Senate.

=== Taiwan ===
The Legislative Yuan is the highest legislative body of Taiwan. The president of the Legislative Yuan presides over its meetings and is elected by the legislators from among themselves. Until 1993, the president of the Control Yuan was elected by and from the members like the speaker of many other parliamentary bodies.

=== United Kingdom ===
==== Westminster ====
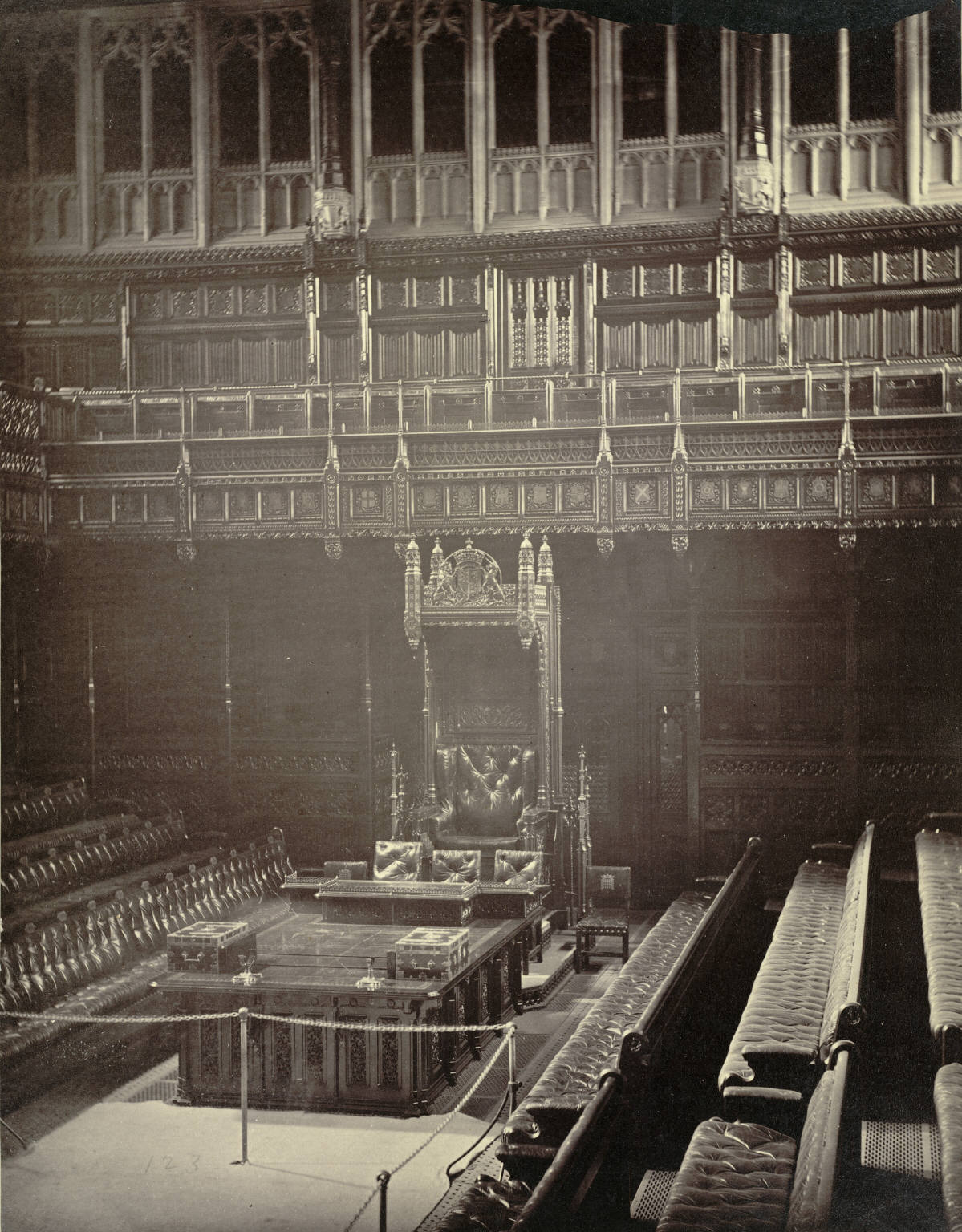
The Speaker's Chair in the UK House of Commons (19th century photograph)

In the Parliament of the United Kingdom, the speaker is the individual elected to preside over the elected House of Commons. The speaker is a member of Parliament (MP) and is elected at the beginning of each new parliament by fellow MPs. MPs also elect three deputy speakers, known as the chairman of Ways and Means and the first and second deputy chairmen of Ways and Means. The speaker is expected to be politically impartial following their appointment.

The Lord Speaker is the presiding officer of the House of Lords. The presiding officer of the House of Lords was until recently the Lord Chancellor, who was also a member of the government (a cabinet member) and the head of the judicial branch. The Lord Chancellor did not have the same authority to discipline members of the Lords that the speaker of the Commons has in that house. The Lord Speaker is elected by the members of the House of Lords and is expected to be politically impartial.

==== Devolved legislatures ====
The presiding officer of the Scottish Parliament is the speaker of the Scottish Parliament.

The Llywydd of the Senedd is the speaker of the Senedd, the Welsh parliament.

The speaker of the Northern Ireland Assembly is the speaker of the Northern Ireland Assembly.

=== United States ===
==== Federal ====
Both chambers of the United States Congress have a presiding officer defined by the United States Constitution. The speaker of the United States House of Representatives presides over the lower house of Congress, the House of Representatives. The speaker, elected by the entire House, is the top-ranking officer of the legislative branch of the federal government. Unlike in Commonwealth realms, the position is partisan, and the speaker often plays an important part in running the House and advancing a political platform; Joseph Gurney Cannon, speaker from 1903 to 1911, is an extreme example.

The vice president of the United States, as provided by the United States Constitution formally presides over the upper house, the Senate. In practice, however, the vice president does not regularly appear in Congress owing to responsibilities in the executive branch and the fact that the vice president may only vote to break a tie, something that rarely occurs due to the filibuster preventing tie votes from occurring in practice. In the vice president's absence, the presiding role is delegated to the most senior member of the majority party, who is the president pro tempore of the United States Senate. Since the Senate's rules give little power to its non-member presider (who may be of the minority party), the task of presiding over daily business is typically rotated among junior members of the majority party.

==== States ====
In the forty-nine states that have a bicameral legislature, the highest leadership position in the lower house is usually called the "Speaker" and the upper house is usually the "President of the (State) Senate". In Nebraska—the only state with a unicameral legislature—the senators elect one senator to serve as "Speaker of the Nebraska Legislature", who presides over legislative sessions in the absence of the lieutenant governor but retains the powers typical of other legislative speakers. In Tennessee, the senators elect a "Speaker of the Senate" who presides over the Tennessee Senate and serves as lieutenant governor.

=== Zimbabwe ===
In the Parliament of Zimbabwe, the speaker is the individual elected to preside over the National Assembly. The speaker may or may not be a member of Parliament (MP) at the time of their election, and is elected at the beginning of each new parliament by MPs. However, if an MP is elected Speaker, they cease to be an MP and a by-election is called for their constituency. The speaker is expected to be politically impartial following their appointment.

The President of the Senate is the presiding officer of the Senate. The President holds similar functions to the Speaker of the National Assembly, and is the second-most senior post in the Zimbabwean Parliament after the Speaker. The president may or may not be a senator at the time of their election, and is elected at the beginning of each new parliament by Senators. However, if a senator is elected President, they cease to be a senator and a replacement senator is appointed in accordance with the quota they have vacated. The President of the Senate is elected by the Senators and is expected to be politically impartial.

== Similar posts ==
The presiding officer for an upper house of a bicameral legislature usually has a different title such as Chairperson or President of the senate when the upper house is called a senate, but they have the same duties. Australia, Chile, the United States and many other countries have upper houses with presiding officers titled "president". In several American republics, the vice president of the country serves as the president of the upper house. This pattern is not universal, however. Some upper houses, including those of Canada, have a speaker.

== See also ==
=== Generic ===
- Speaker of the senate (disambiguation)
- Speaker of the House of Assembly (disambiguation)
- Speaker of the House of Commons
- Speaker of the House of Representatives (disambiguation)
- Speaker of the Legislative Assembly
- Speaker of the National Assembly (disambiguation)
- List of current presidents of assembly

=== Specific ===
- Lawspeaker
- President of the Federal Senate (Brazil)
- President of the Chamber of Deputies (Brazil)
- Speaker of the Senate of Canada
- Speaker of the Lok Sabha
- Lord Speaker (Speaker of the United Kingdom House of Lords)
- List of speakers of the House of Commons of England
- Speaker of the Indonesian People's Representative Council
- Cathaoirleach (Speaker of the Irish Senate)
- President of the Dewan Negara (Speaker of the upper house of the Parliament of Malaysia)
- Speaker of the Dewan Rakyat (lower house of the Parliament of Malaysia)
- Speaker of the Palestinian Legislative Council
- Speaker of the Legislative Assembly of Ontario
- Marshal of the Senate of the Republic of Poland
- Speaker of the Grand National Assembly of Turkey
- Speaker of the United States House of Representatives
