= Federal Council =

Federal Council may refer to:

== Governmental bodies ==
- Federal Council of Australasia, a forerunner to the current Commonwealth of Australia
- Federal Council of Austria, the upper house of the Austrian federal parliament
- Federal Council of Germany, the representation of the 16 federal states of Germany at the federal level
  - Federal Council of the German Empire, the highest legislative body of the German Empire
- Federal Council (Iraq), alternative name of Iraq's Federation Council
- Federal Council (Switzerland), the federal government of Switzerland
- Federal Council (Syria), a body of the Syrian Federation under the French Mandate
- Federation Council (Russia), the upper house of the Russian federal parliament
- Federal Executive Council (Australia), the formal body holding executive authority under the Australian Constitution
- Federal Financial Institutions Examination Council, a formal inter-agency body of the United States government
- Federal Legislative Council (Malaya), the legislative body of Federation of Malaya
- Federal National Council (United Arab Emirates), the legislature of the United Arab Emirates
- Federal Advisory Council, a consultative and advisory body composed of representatives from the US Federal Reserve Banks
- Federal Salary Council, an advisory body of the executive branch of the United States Government
- Federal Supreme Council (United Arab Emirates), the highest constitutional authority in the United Arab Emirates

== Others ==
- Democratic Alliance Federal Council, the governing and policy-making body of the Democratic Alliance, the official opposition party in South Africa
- Federal Bar Council, a U.S. lawyers' organization who practice in federal courts within the Second Circuit
- Federal Council of Medicine, the agency in charge of medical licencing in Brazil
- Federal Networking Council, chartered by the US National Science and Technology Council's Committee on Computing, Information and Communications (CCIC) to act as a forum for networking collaborations among US federal agencies

== See also ==
- Central Executive Committee (disambiguation)
- Federation Council
- Executive Council (disambiguation)
