= Speaker of the House of Assembly =

Speaker of the House of Assembly may refer to any of the following presiding officers ("speakers") of legislative bodies styled Houses of Assembly:

Anguilla

- Speaker of the Anguilla House of Assembly

Australia

- Speaker of South Australian House of Assembly
- Speaker of the Tasmanian House of Assembly

(The Bahamas) Bahamas

- Speaker of the Bahamas House of Assembly

Barbados

- Speaker of the Barbados House of Assembly

Bermuda

- Speaker of the House of Assembly of Bermuda

Canada

- Speaker of the Newfoundland and Labrador House of Assembly
- Speaker of the Nova Scotia House of Assembly

Dominica

- Speaker of the House of Assembly of Dominica

Gibraltar

- Speaker of the Gibraltar House of Assembly (renamed Gibraltar Parliament in 2006)

Kiribati

- Speaker of the House of Assembly of Kiribati

Nigeria

Nigeria's state legislatures are styled "houses of assembly", each chaired by a speaker:

- Speaker of the Anambra State House of Assembly
- Speaker of the Edo State House of Assembly
- Speaker of the Kano State House of Assembly
- Speaker of the Lagos State House of Assembly
- Speaker of the Rivers State House of Assembly

Saint Lucia

- Speaker of the House of Assembly of Saint Lucia

Saint Vincent and the Grenadines

- Speaker of the House of Assembly of Saint Vincent and the Grenadines

Eswatini

- Speaker of the House of Assembly of Eswatini

Zimbabwe

- Speaker of the National Assembly of Zimbabwe
