= Professional speaker =

Professional speaker may refer to:

- Keynote speaker
- Motivational speaker
- Public speaker
- Speaker (politics)
- Voice actor
- Professional loudspeaker

== Notable persons ==
- John J. Sweeney (professional speaker)

== See also ==
- Speaker (disambiguation)
- National Speakers Association
- Speakers bureau
- Speaking fee
- Association of Speakers Clubs
- Toastmasters International
