= Toastmaster (disambiguation) =

Toastmaster may refer to:

- Toastmaster, a role at public speaking events
- A member of Toastmasters International
- Toastmaster (magazine), the official publication of Toastmasters International
- Toastmaster (appliances), a brand of toasters and other small kitchen appliances
