= Speaker =

Speaker most commonly refers to:

- Speaker, a person who produces speech
- Loudspeaker, a device that produces sound
  - Computer speakers
  - Boombox

Speaker, Speakers, or The Speaker may also refer to:

== Arts and entertainment ==
- "Speaker" (song), by David Banner, 2008
- "Speakers" (Sam Hunt song), 2014
- "Speakers", a song by Moka Only from the album Vermilion, 2007
- The Speaker, the second book in Traci Chee's Sea of Ink and Gold trilogy, 2017
- The Speaker (periodical), a British weekly review, 1890 to 1907
- The Speaker (TV series), a British television series, 2009

== People ==
- Tris Speaker (1888–1958), American baseball player
- Raymond Speaker (born 1935), Canadian politician

== Politics ==
- Speaker (politics), the presiding officer of a legislative body, including
  - Speaker of the House of Commons (Canada)
  - Speaker of the House of Commons (United Kingdom)
  - Speaker of the United States House of Representatives

== Other uses ==
- HMS Speaker, various ships
- Speaker Township, Michigan, United States

== See also ==
- Motivational speaker
- Native Speaker (disambiguation)
- Professional speaker (disambiguation)
- Speaker of the House of Representatives (disambiguation)
- Speakers' Corner (disambiguation)
- Character (arts), the literary character who utters lyrics in poetry
- Grammatical person, the distinction between participants in human speech
- Los Speakers (Spanish: "The Speakers"), a Colombian rock band
- Public speaker, one who speaks to a live audience
  - Orator, an eloquent or skilled public speaker
- Speaker driver, the essential electromechanical element of a loudspeaker
- Speakers Bank, Chagos Archipelago
- Spokesperson, one who speaks on behalf of others
- Voice actor, one who performs a character or provides information with their voice
