= Ralph C. Smedley =

Founder of Toastmasters International

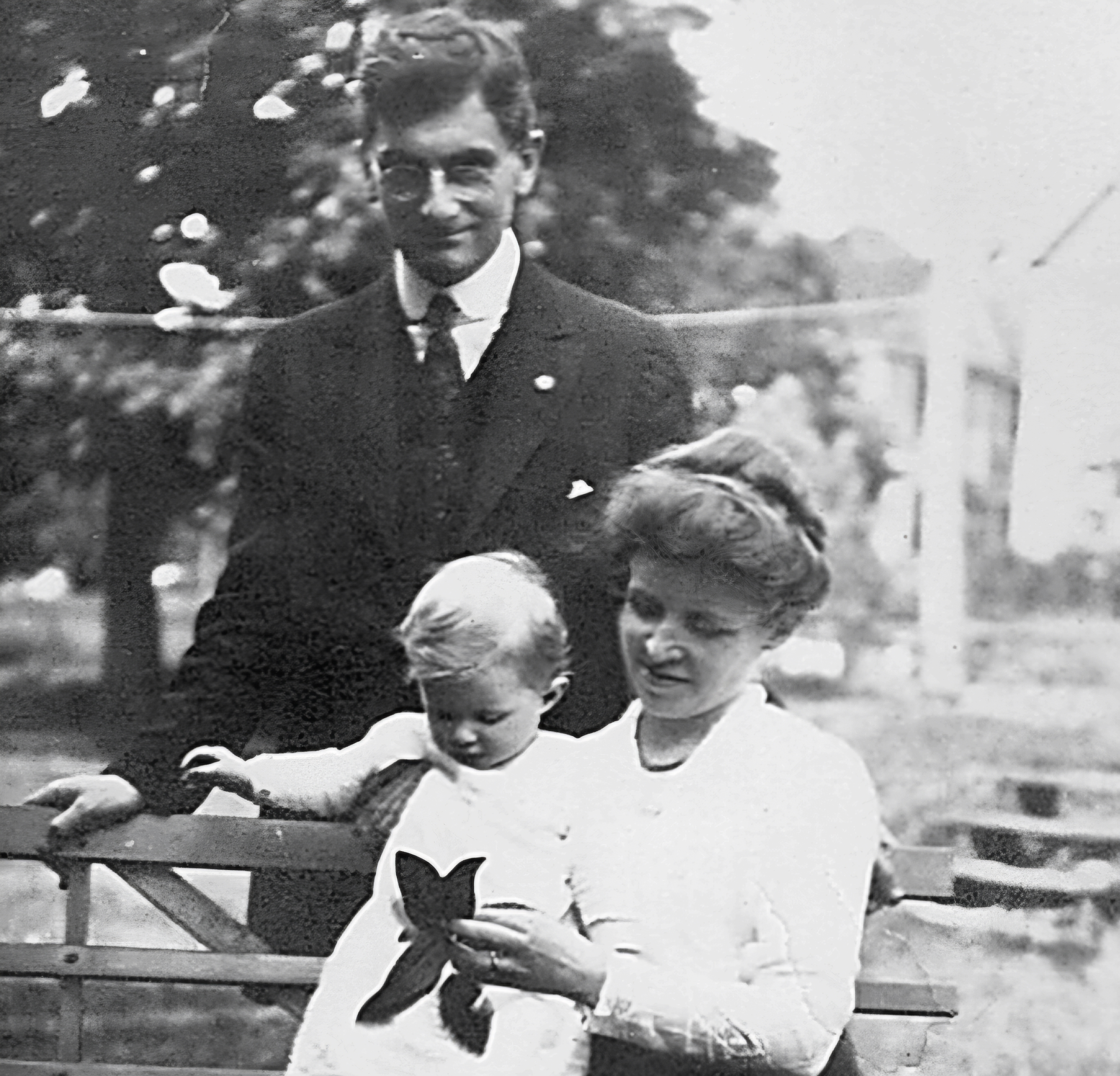
- Smedley with his wife Frances and daughter Betty (circa 1920)
- Born: Ralph Chesnut Smedley; January 22, 1878; Waverly, Illinois
- Died: September 11, 1965 (aged 87); Waverly, Illinois
- Education: Illinois Wesleyan University
- Known for: Toastmasters International

Ralph Chesnut Smedley (February 22, 1878 – September 11, 1965) was the founder of Toastmasters International, an international public speaking organization. He was also an official with the YMCA.

== Early life and education ==
Smedley was born in Waverly, Illinois, a city twenty miles southwest of Springfield.

He remained in Illinois most of his youth. After high school, he taught at schools in the countryside before enrolling at Illinois Wesleyan University in Bloomington, Illinois. He graduated in 1903 and then started working at the local YMCA, where he delivered speeches and conducted meetings as the educational director.

== Career with the YMCA and Toastmasters ==
While working for the YMCA in Bloomington, he saw the need to develop interpersonal skills pertaining to communication, management and leadership in the community. In order to help people learn how to speak, conduct meetings, plan programs and work on committee. He started his first Toastmasters speaking club on March 24, 1905. Laying the foundational methodologies which are followed in Toastmasters meetings today, the members took turns speaking and taking part in leadership in every meeting. Smedley and other more experienced men evaluated the short speeches given by younger men willing to improve. However, he had to eventually relocate to a YMCA in Freeport, Illinois and the lack of proper leadership did not allow the original club to survive.

In Freeport, he tried again. This time he was trying to encourage local businessmen to sign up and improve their speaking abilities. After he was transferred, that club failed, as did his later club efforts at YMCAs in Rock Island, Illinois and San Jose, California.

His Toastmasters idea finally caught on for good when he relocated to take a job at the YMCA in Santa Ana, California. On October 22, 1924, he organized the first fully successful club in the newly built YMCA building that eventually became Club No. 1 of Toastmasters International. Word about the club spread quickly and people in neighboring communities and other states started asking Smedley how they could start their own club. He wrote the Manual of Instructions and Ten Lessons in Public Speaking, and he printed and bound these publications. On October 25, 1928, he secured copyrights on the publications and trademarked the name "Toastmasters Club." He based the name on the word toastmaster which refers to the person who gives toasts at events, gatherings and occasions.

By 1930, close to 30 Toastmasters clubs had started including a club in British Columbia, Canada. In order to encourage expansion outside of the United States, the organization was renamed to Toastmasters International. The new name was inspired by Rotary International.

In 1932, Toastmasters International was incorporated as a California non-profit organization and Smedley took several positions such as secretary and editor.

Smedley kept his day job at the YMCA but spent his evenings writing articles about the art of speaking. Some of that literature is still used by Toastmasters today. His theory about good speaking, simply put, is that a person should address a group just as he or she would one person.

Over the years, Toastmasters continued to grow. In 1941, the organization was large enough to hire Smedley as its full time leader. He gave up his job as general secretary of the Santa Ana YMCA and rented a 12-by-16-foot office in downtown Santa Ana. From there, he handled the organization's growing correspondence and distributed educational materials to clubs that were springing up across the nation and around the world. As the group's educational director, he wrote the two manuals, Basic Training and Beyond Basic Training, that Toastmasters still use. He also edited the organization's magazine, The Toastmaster, and wrote many of its articles.

Ralph C. Smedley

Smedley was honored by Toastmasters International in 1956 at a national convention where he was elected president and board member for life. He continued to work for the organization as educational director and lived in Orange County, California until his death in 1965 at 87.

== Personal life ==
Smedley married Frances Bass in 1904, and in 1915, the couple gave birth to their only child, Betty.

He was a member of Rotary International for 47 years and attended every local meeting for 38 years.

Smedley was an active member of the First Presbyterian Church of Santa Ana where he served as a Sunday school teacher for several years.

Smedley has been described as a modest and quiet person. His daughter Betty remembered that he was a stamp collector who exchanged stamps with people all over the world. He played the piano and the flute for many years, and enjoyed camping and fishing with his family.

== Legacy ==
Illinois Wesleyan University recognized Smedley's contributions by conferring him the honorary degree of Doctor of Humane Letters (L.H.D.) in 1950. Santa Ana, California named a junior high school after him in 1955.

== Works ==
- The man behind the rules: An account of the life and work of Henry Martyn Robert, author of Robert's Rules of order (1937)
- The Amateur Chairman (1952)
- Speech Evaluation: The Art of Constructive Criticism (1940)
- The Voice of the Speaker (1949)
- Speech Engineering: 25 Ways to Build a Speech (1952)
- The Amateur Chairman (Toastmasters International) (1952)
- The Great Peacemaker (1955)
- Basic Training for Toastmasters (1956)
- The Story of Toastmasters: Reminiscences of the Founder (1959)
- Beyond Basic Training (1961)
- The Advanced Speaker (1963)
- Personally Speaking: Selections from the Writings of Ralph C. Smedley (1966)
