= Mohammed Qahtani =

Saudi Arabian motivational speaker, engineer

- محمد القحطاني
- Citizenship: Saudi Arabia
- Education: Arizona State University (BSc)
- Occupations: Public speaker, Cyber Security Engineer
- Years active: 2015 - present
- Known for: Winner of the 2015 Toastmasters International World Championship of Public Speaking
- Notable work: The power of words, the journey of a stuttering champion
- Awards: World Championship of Public Speaking 2015
- Website: www.qahtanispeaks.com

Mohammed Abdullah Qahtani is a Saudi Arabian Toastmaster speaker, security engineer and author. He is acknowledged for his work in the fields of personal development, leadership, and communication. He rose to prominence and limelight after winning the 2015 World Championship of Public Speaking.

== Biography ==
Qahtani grew up with a stutter and had experienced difficulties speaking eloquently in a consistent flow since his childhood. He was subject to bullying in his childhood for his stuttering speech impediment. He uttered a word for the first time at the age of six. He joined a Toastmasters club in 2009 based on a recommendation from one of his friends, to tackle and mitigate challenges related to stuttering.

He utilised his strong sense of humour, which had been his strength when delivering his public speeches at Toastmasters to counter the weaknesses of his stage presence and vocal delivery. He went on to deliver speeches by managing to limit the impact of stuttering through immense practices. He played to his strengths in performing stand-up comedy as an undergraduate student at Arizona State University. He graduated with a bachelor's degree in the field of Computer science at the Arizona State University.

== Career ==
He gained significant traction and was a centre of attention in public speaking forum when he was adjudged as the outright winner of the Toastmasters International World Championship of Public Speaking in 2015, which was held in Las Vegas. He also set a benchmark by becoming the first Arab to emerge triumphant in Toastmasters International World Championship of Public Speaking. He is the only Saudi Arabian to have won the Toastmasters International World Championship of Public Speaking. In August 2015, he was one of the nine finalists who were selected for the grand finale of 2015 Toastmasters International's Public Speaking World Championship. He received critical acclaim, accolades and widespread popularity at the global level for his award-winning speech titled The Power of Words which fetched him the world title in public speaking. He progressed to the grand finale of 2015 Toastmasters International's Public Speaking World Championship, after having developed a presence of mind during the seven rounds of the competition which lasted for a duration of six months and he battled his way out with approximately 33,000 competitors from around the world.

Qahtani predominantly engaged in encouraging and empowering individuals to help them come out of their comfort zone by guiding them to practice effective communication skills. He has also delivered keynote speeches on the importance of leadership to implement crisis management, importance of overcoming career burnout due to workload, importance of work-life balance and mitigation of resistance to change to focus on change management. He has also delivered motivational speeches and workshops with the intention of mentoring individuals to enhance their public speaking abilities.

== See also ==
- List of stutterers
