= Nita Patel (engineer) =

American electrical engineer

Nita Kantilal Patel is an American electrical engineer, the 2023 president of the IEEE Computer Society. She works for Otis Worldwide as senior director of engineering for the Lead Design Center–Farmington, where her work involves the development of internet of things platforms.

== Education and career ==
Patel comes from a family of physicians and businesspeople; she has described herself as the "black sheep of the family" for pursuing engineering instead. She was a student at Southern Methodist University, where she earned bachelor's degrees in mathematics and electrical engineering in 1995, and a master's degree in computer engineering in 1998.

Before working for Otis, she worked in Texas on Bradley Fighting Vehicle systems for Texas Instruments, in Oklahoma on NEXRAD weather radar technology for RS Information Systems, and in New Hampshire on long-wave infrared military imaging for L3 Insight Technology.

== Personal life ==
Patel married Alex Relyea, whom she met when both were students at Southern Methodist. Both Patel and Relyea are active in organizing chess tournaments, and Patel is listed as a national chess arbiter by FIDE. She is also active in Toastmasters International.

== Recognition ==
Patel was named New Hampshire Engineer of the Year in 2011 by the New Hampshire engineering societies. She was the 2014 recipient of the IEEE Member and Geographic Activities Larry K. Wilson Transnational Award, "for distinguished contributions to IEEE global activities through the creation, development, and implementation of the inaugural IEEE Women in Engineering International Leadership Conference, a comprehensive, multi-year strategic business plan, and for expanding the global reach of the IEEE Women in Engineering mission to inspire, engage, and advance women in technology".
