= Manoj Vasudevan =

Speaker and author

- Born: November 17, 1973 (age 53)
- Occupations: Speaker, author, consultant
- Website: thoughtexpressions.com

Manoj Vasudevan (born November 17, 1973) is an International speaker, author, consultant, and coach. He is the founder of Thought Expressions. Vasudevan is best known for winning the World Championship of Public Speaking by Toastmasters International in 2017.

== Early life and education ==
Vasudevan was born in Kerala, India. He completed engineering in Electronics and Communication from College of Engineering Trivandrum and thereafter completed MBA from Imperial College London. He currently lives in Singapore.

== Career ==
Vasudevan started his career in 1995 as a software engineer and joined PricewaterhouseCoopers Management Consulting Services as a principal consultant. He left PwC in 2004 to start his own company and founded Thought Expressions in 2008 to help people become speakers, leaders, and influencers. Vasudevan has given motivational talks to multinational corporate houses for leadership, team-building, and personal breakthroughs. He authored the book Mastering Leadership The Mousetrap Way.

Vasudevan is a professional speaker and coaches executives and entrepreneurs.

== Awards ==
- World Champion of Public Speaking by Toastmasters International.
- Top-25 Standup comedians at the International Comedy Festival in Hong Kong

== Personal life ==
Vasudevan married entrepreneur and author Sindu Sreebhavan in 1998. They have two children, named Advaith Vasudevan and Aditi Vasudevan.
