= Dananjaya Hettiarachchi =

Sri Lankan public speaker

Dananjaya Hettiarachchi is a Sri Lankan internet personality, motivational speaker, trainer, human resource development specialist, dancer, educator and public speaker. He rose to prominence and limelight after winning the 2014 World Championship of Public Speaking.

== Biography ==
Dananjaya was born in Nuwara Eliya, Sri Lanka. His parents later moved and relocated to Colombo as his parents expected him to study at S. Thomas' College, Mount Lavinia. However, much to his parents' expectations, he endured disappointing academic performance as his academic performance began to deteriorate in his schooling days. He was also hesitant and lethargic to show up for extracurricular activities like debating, theatre or speech. He was also reportedly facing a dilemma as he could not figure out an appropriate and acceptable way of living, and he did not have a clear goal in his life until the age of 16. He was arrested for an assault case that took place at another school, and he was considered a brawn thug in his social circles. His life trajectory changed completely when his mother visited the police station in order to take Dananjaya out of prison, and he started behaving in an obedient manner ever since he witnessed his mother crying in shame at the police station. He also met Anton Samarasinghe, who gave him life advice, which prompted him to attend dancing classes, and Dananjaya became a professional dancer.

== Career ==
His father convinced him to join Toastmasters, and took him voluntarily to a Toastmasters club meeting with the aim of improving Dananjaya's public speaking skills and help him conquer his fear of public speaking. His father understood the need of sending Dananjaya to a Toastmasters forum by acknowledging the plight of his son after realizing he was ever so close to the mother, which literally made him a coward psychologically. He met Arunasalam Balraj who was the President of Toastmasters Colombo who convinced him to take part at the World Taped Speech Contest 2006 which he eventually won. He also delivered a speech titled Appeal to the Nation at the 2006 All Island Best Speaker contest where he expected himself to be placed first, but could not make it to the top 4 list of contestants for the final round.

He was crowned as the world champion of public speaking during the 2014 Toastmasters International Convention which was held in Kuala Lumpur, Malaysia and he eventually became the first ever Sri Lankan to win the Toastmasters Public Speaking World Championship. He was one of the nine finalists who were selected for the grand finale of 2014 Toastmasters International's Public Speaking World Championship. He received critical acclaim, accolades and widespread popularity at the global level for his award-winning speech titled I See Something which fetched him the world title in public speaking. His speech I See Something which has a time duration of 7 minutes and 20 seconds eventually garnered over 10 million views on YouTube and the speech was widely regarded as an inspirational speech content for many budding aspiring Toastmasters from all over the world. His unique technique in describing his sequence of life changing moments using a rose flower in a metaphorical manner and through the usage of conversation mode during the start of the speech proceedings caught the attention of many viewers and audience who were present in the auditorium listening to his speech. He started his speech with the tagline "You and I are not very different from this flower. Just like this flower is unique, you are unique" in addressing and pointing out fingers directly at the target audience who were present during the course of the speech delivery. He also ended the speech with an interesting line indicating "Ladies and gentlemen, when I look at you, I see something in you, but I don't know what it is" reiterating the speech title and the main theme of the speech while also ending the climax of his speech by narrating a humorous punchline. The speech which he delivered at the 2014 Toastmasters International Convention is loosely inspired, reused and taken from the portion of Dananjaya's own previous 20 minutes long speech which he narrated at the 2012's TEDx Youth in Colombo.
