= Communication apprehension =

Anxiety about an expected communication

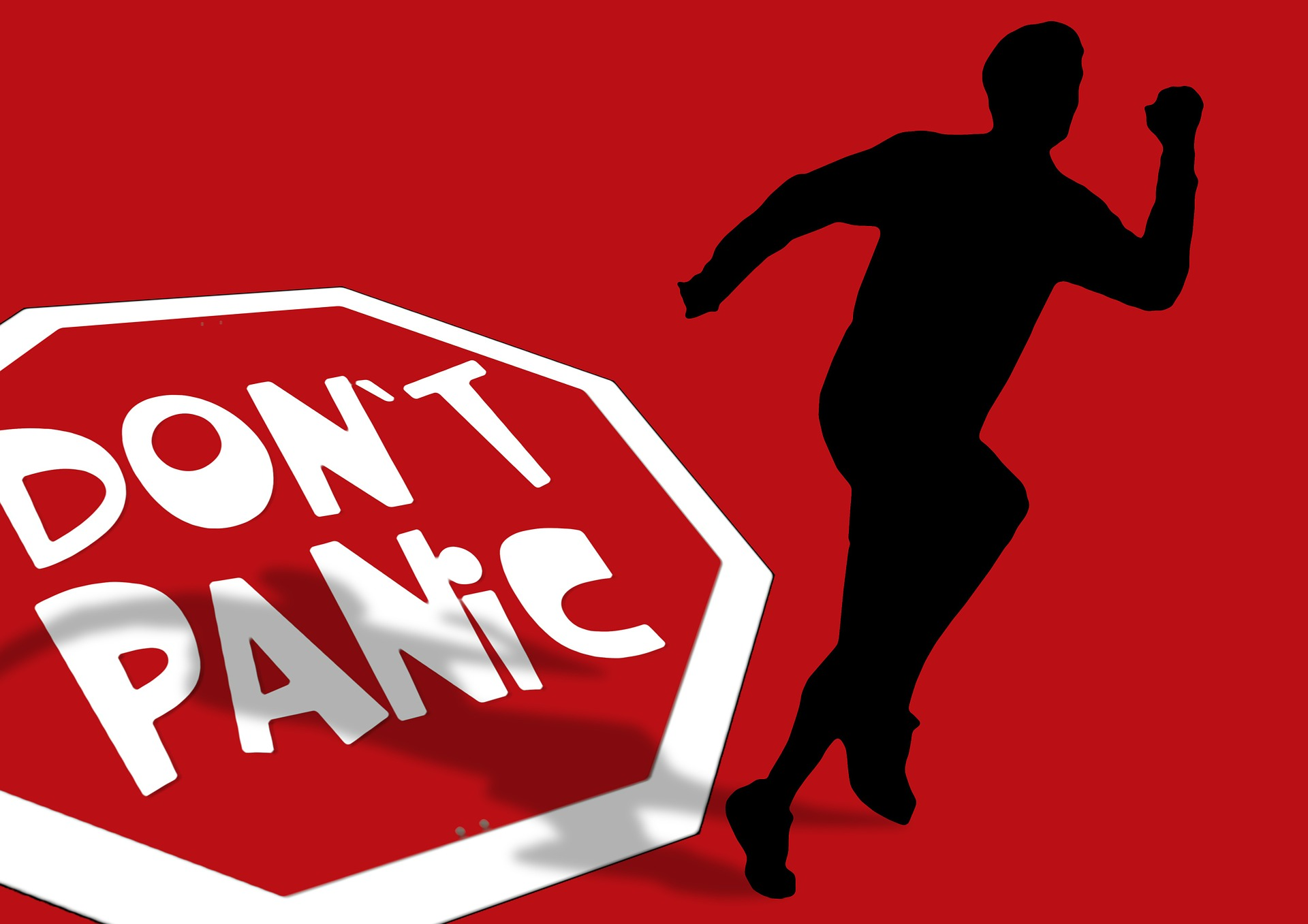
"Don't panic" silhouette

Communication apprehension is a degree or measure of the anxiety triggered by the real or anticipated communication act, as defined by James C. McCroskey. The fear of judgment from the audience and self-image are two factors which fuel the anxiety. Since communication can be oral or written, communication apprehension (CA) is divided into oral communication apprehension (OCA) and written communication apprehension (WCA).

Communication apprehension can cause a variety of involuntary responses such as "stomach butterflies" which is your body shutting the digestive system down and going into the fight-or-flight response, shaking, nausea, sweating, forgetting the information, among many others.

The term oral communication apprehension is usually connected with stage fright; however, this response is not necessarily connected with a delivery on a stage or in front of a large audience. This anxiety can be caused by any of the four forms of communication: interpersonal, group, public, and mass communication.

The most common and reliable test used to measure an individual's OCA level when exposed to these forms of communication is called the Personal Report of Communication Apprehension, also known as the PRCA-24 test, and it follows a survey format. WCA is commonly measured using versions of the WCA questionnaire developed by Daly and Miller.

== Types ==
There are different types of communication apprehension, each of these types represent a specific or general situation that presents a stimuli for this anxiety response. McCroskey argues that there are four types of communication apprehension:

=== Trait anxiety ===
Trait anxiety is considered a personality type, which represents that the individual has an orientation to feel anxiety during the communication act regardless of the situation, audience or context. This type of people will avoid exposing themselves to a communication situation, since their communication apprehension is part of their daily behavior.

McCroskey and Beatty argue that some people have a higher vulnerability factor for communication apprehension due to genetics, also known as communibiology. Many researchers oppose this idea and argue that it cannot be solely inherited but rather a personality trait acquired; therefore, it can be changed. However, they can compromise that around 80% of communication apprehension is obtained within our neurological structures, which are determined genetically. Furthermore, only 20% is influenced by an environmental stimulus. Meaning that this type of communication apprehension can be improved with practice and other techniques; however, it will not be eliminated since it is inherited.

=== Context anxiety ===
Context anxiety triggers communication apprehension due to a specific context. This is considered a psychological response caused by a specific context but not necessarily on others; a person can have no problem talking to their best friend but can experience anxiety while talking in front of a class. The most known example for context anxiety is public speaking; almost 70% of students have a certain level of communication apprehension triggered by public speaking. There are other contexts that can create a similar response, such as speaking in a class, small group discussion, or meeting.

=== Audience anxiety ===
Audience anxiety is when a specific individual or group of people creates a problem on communication, or a reverse reaction. For some people, anxiety can be caused by familiar peers, while for others it can be caused by unfamiliar faces. At the beginning of a speech class, the students tend to be fearful since they see new faces, which increase the levels of communication apprehension. However, once the students get to know each other they feel comfortable, decreasing or eliminating their levels of apprehension.

=== Situation anxiety ===
Situational anxiety is a psychological reaction of a person due to a specific situation that may not have any relation with the person or context. This anxiety is triggered by a special combination of audience and context that involves different dimensions and creates a unique scenario. For an example, on a first date a person may not have communication apprehension; however, the situation of being with a person that they have feelings for, in a new environment, in the first time they have experienced the situation, can increase stress levels and create communication apprehension.

== Treatments ==
Peer practice has been proven to be effective in combating speech anxiety. A dissertation on the effect of peer practice on high school students showed that peer practice was statistically significant in reducing overall CA in high school students. Students who did not utilize peer practice had higher overall levels of CA. Another study agrees with these findings and also stated that the presence of an audience is important while practicing because it provides an engaged audience for the speaker and provide constructive criticism which also helps the speaker prepare for speech day. This study also showed the benefits of tutoring while also using peer practice which is also another way the speaker can receive feedback and improve on their speech so their anxiety level will be lowered.

Virtual Reality (VR) has also benefited individuals struggling with CA. Virtual Reality Therapy is a technology that enables users to enter computer-generated worlds and interact with them through sight, sound, and touch. VR may provide them with a sense of mastery or self-efficacy and, in turn, result in improved perception of performance and satisfaction with performance. The VR Practice can help with the anxiety that is caused by CA and help the speaker feel more prepared overall. Often VR is used as exposure therapy in conjunction with Cognitive Behavior Therapy (CBT) to treat public speaking anxiety.

Drug therapies and meditation have also been successful in treating CA. Selective serotonin reuptake inhibitors (SSRIs) have been found to be a successful treatment for speech anxiety. There is also a possible role of vitamin C in decreasing the physiological signs of stress. Meditation has been found to help significantly reduce anxiety in speakers naturally. One study found that the speakers who did not meditate had increased stress even after multiple trials; they did not have a habituation-related decreased level of stress.

== PRCA ==
The PRCA-24 is a test created to determine the communication comfort level of a speaker. This test shows that communication apprehension is not limited to public speaking since it includes different situations that can trigger anxiety, these situations belong to an apprehension triggered by context, context anxiety. The four situations that are presented on the test are: group discussion, meetings, interpersonal, and public speaking. Currently, the PRCA-24 is the most preferred and reliable test above all others. Recently, however, research conducted by Croucher, et al. questioned the multi-national sustainability of the PRCA-24 and suggest more research was needed in different countries. Many different factors contribute to the accurateness of the results. The validity of the PRCA-24 should not be generally queried in intercultural contexts, the results should be interpreted with caution. While numerous national cultures have been studied, many are still left unexplored. However, Hsiao and Bankole, who utilized this tool in foreign countries, have suggested that modifications to the PRCA-24 would make it more appropriate for non-western cultures.

This test provides an easy equation to obtain a score for each category, these scores are compared to the ranges provided at the end of the test; these ranges were obtained by a study of over 40,000 college students and over 3,000 non-students adults provided on a national sample. By this comparison, the test taker can determine their level of communication apprehension for each scenario, ranking them with a low, moderate or high level of apprehension. The test is able to provide a diagnostic of context anxiety and overall communication apprehension by simply adding the sub scores and comparing the total score. Results of administration of the PRCA-24 in a variety of contexts generally reveal public speaking to be the mode of oral communication which generating the highest levels of apprehension.

== Typical behavioral patterns ==
There are three typical behavioral patterns found in people who have a high level of CA.

Communication avoidance can be seen when people lead their lives in a way that avoids any communication as it would bring them discomfort. For example, they will avoid jobs that involve a lot of communication or choose to live in areas where the chances of communication opportunities are lower.

The second behavioral pattern comes into play when people with CA are faced with a circumstance where they were not able to use communication avoidance. In this case, the individual would use communication withdrawal, which can be utter silence or the absolute minimal communication. Examples are only speaking when spoken to or to answer questions and keeping responses short. The nonverbal messages, including standing or sitting away from others, frowning, avoiding eye contacts and standing with arms folded, can signal to others that a person is not interested in communicating and tend to reduce communication initiation attempts from others.

The third behavioral pattern is communication disruption when a person with CA attempts to communicate, however, the discomfort is shown with their verbal disfluencies and poor communicative strategies. It happens when an attempt is made to take on an uncomfortable situation that involves communication. It is often shown in the form of influent and unnatural or inappropriate verbal and nonverbal behaviors, all reflecting their CA.
