= Toastmaster =

Person in charge of the proceedings of a public speaking event

Toastmaster is a general term, prevalent in the United States in the mid-20th century, referring to a person in charge of the proceedings of a public speaking event. The toastmaster is typically charged with organization of the event, arranging the order of speakers, introducing one or more of the speakers, and keeping the event on schedule. Such meetings typically include civic events, service organization meetings, and banquets for various purposes.

== Description ==
In meetings, a toastmaster typically addresses the audience from behind a dais or from a podium. At stage entertainment events, especially ones broadcast on live television, the toastmaster often takes the form of a master of ceremonies, introducing the entertainment acts. The term has fallen out of use to a large degree.

== History ==
James Toole, father of actor John Lawrence Toole, was possibly the first professional toastmaster during the 1840s in London. There are allusions to him in the press of the day. His obituary noted his "stentorian voice, and the ability with which he kept very large companies in order".

William Kingsmith was the first to wear the red coat now associated with the London Society of Toastmasters, as he wanted to be distinguished from waitstaff and footmen. He was the public announcer at the 1908 London Olympic games, and presided over court functions at St. James's Palace, ceremonies at the House of Commons and Royal Albert Hall.

A widely known person associated with this role was George Jessel, known in his lifetime as "Toastmaster General of the United States" (parodying the title Postmaster General of the United States).

== Role ==
In service organizations and businesses, the role of toastmaster was a permanently assigned role, but often rotating among members. Toastmasters were largely expected to keep the event from becoming boring, and a cottage industry arose in the middle century to cater to the desire of businessmen and other leaders to overcome the fear of public speaking. Would-be toastmasters were typically counseled to use light humor, and to have anecdotes and epigrams handily memorized. Toastmasters International is an organization dedicated to helping people in public speaking and in fulfilling the role of toastmaster and leader.

Such was the importance of a toastmaster remaining sober in order to conduct events, he may have had a special cup, called the toastmaster's glass, which, although of the same size and shape as others at the event, in fact was of much lower capacity due to an almost solid interior. Several such glasses are now displayed at the Victoria and Albert Museum in London.

== See also ==
- Tamada, a Georgian toastmaster
- Toastmasters International
