= World Championship of Public Speaking =

Largest global speech contest with 50,000+ participants

Tournament information
- Established: 1938
- Number of tournaments: 81

Current champion
- Sabyasachi Sengupta

The World Championship of Public Speaking began in 1938 and has grown to over 50,000 participants in 149 countries in 2022. In its early decades, it was referred to as the Toastmasters Speech Contest. By the 1990s, there were about 10,000 participants every year. The contest's popularity grew rapidly in the 2000s. The contest has been called the "largest speech contest in the world" by Daijiworld.

== History ==
1960 champion Glenn E. Carroll is the first non-American (from Canada) to win the title. 1977 champion Evelyn Jane Burgay is the first woman to win the title. 1982 champion Kenneth Bernard is the first from outside North America (Australia) to win the title. 1985 champion Marie C. Pyne is the first European (Ireland) to win the title. 1995 Champion Mark Brown is the first and only Jamaican to win the title. 2014 champion Dananjaya Hettiarachchi of Sri Lanka was the first Asian to win the championship.

Zooming into the South East Asian region, in 2016, Darren Tay of Singapore became the first South East Asian, Singaporean, as well as contestant of Chinese ethnicity to win the championship. In 2008, Lashunda Rundles became the first African American woman to ever win the title of World Champion of Public Speaking. She also was the first woman to win in almost two decades. In 2018, Ramona J. Smith became the second African American woman to win, it had been a decade since a woman took the title. Also in 2018, for the first time ever in the history of Toastmasters International, three women became the top speakers in the world. Sherri Su of China took 2nd place. Anita Fain Taylor of Florida, USA took 3rd place, Ramona J. Smith took 1st place. In 2021 Verity Price (South Africa) became the 6th woman to ever win the international speech contest, and the first speaker in history to win from Africa. In 2024, Luisa Montalvo became the first Hispanic to win this prestigious title. In 2025, Sabyasachi Sengupta from the Netherlands became the first Dutch resident to win the world championship of public speaking.

Year	Name	From
1938	Henry Wiens	Reedley, California
1939	William Roberts	Huntington Park, California
1940	David MacFarlane	Santa Monica, California
1941	John McGinnis	San Francisco, California
1942	Cavett Robert	Phoenix, Arizona
1943	Lloyd Prante	Monrovia, California
1944	NO CONVENTION	
1945	NO CONVENTION	
1946	Thor Myhre	Spokane, Washington
1947	Douglas Sherwin	Clearlake, Iowa
1948	Robert Dellwo	Spokane, Washington
1949	Dalton McAllister	Fort Wayne, Indiana
1950	Charles Hilton	Mason City, Iowa
1951	Albert Green Jr.	Seattle, Washington
1952	George W. Armstrong	Omaha, Nebraska
1953	Theodore B. Furlow	Long Beach, California
1954	Herbert Thompson	Wood River, Illinois
1955	Charles W. Bryant	Tacoma, Washington
1956	David Holmes Jr.	Toledo, Ohio
1957	Charles Jones	Fort Smith, Arkansas
1958	Edmund J. Shine	Hamburg, New York
1959	Dean F. Berkeley	Bloomington, Indiana
1960	Glenn E. Carroll	Kitchener, Ontario, Canada
1961	John J. Carver	Seattle, Washington
1962	Robert Garton	Columbus, Indiana
1963	Larry Beitel	Winston-Salem, North Carolina
1964	Anthony C.L. Bishop	Northridge, California
1965	John L. Nydegger	Lewiston, Idaho
1966	Michael Yaconelli	San Diego, California
1967	Dale Smith	Goshen, Indiana
1968	Grant R. Sheehan	Washington, D.C.
1969	Dennis Mangers	Delano, California
1970	Stephen D. Boyd	Bloomington, Illinois
1971	Bert Angus	Transcona, Manitoba, Canada
1972	Rudy Valle	Canoga Park, California
1973	Charles W. Stewart	San Antonio, Texas
1974	Bennie Powell	Los Angeles, California
1975	Andy McKay	Rochester, New York
1976	William Johnson	Aberdeen, Maryland
1977	Evelyn Jane Burgay	Springfield, Virginia
1978	Michael Aun II	Lexington, South Carolina
1979	Dick Caldwell	Calgary, Alberta, Canada
1980	Jeff Young	Los Angeles, California
1981	Jim Joelson	Reno, Nevada
1982	Kenneth Bernard	Australia
1983	Roy Fenstermaker	Downey, California
1984	Joe Boyd	Bellingham, Washington
1985	Marie C. Pyne	Ireland
1986	M. Arabella Bengson	Islington, Ont., Canada
1987	Harold Patterson	Oklahoma City, Oklahoma
1988	Jerry Starke	Milwaukee, Wisconsin
1989	Don Johnson	Torrance, California
1990	David Brooks	Austin, Texas
1991	David Ross	Norman, Oklahoma
1992	Dana LaMon	Lancaster, California
1993	Otis Williams Jr.	Cincinnati, Ohio
1994	Morgan McArthur	Idaho Falls, Idaho
1995	Mark Brown	Mount Vernon, New York
1996	David Nottage	Auckland, New Zealand
1997	Willie Jones	Honolulu, Hawaii
1998	Brett Rutledge	Auckland, New Zealand
1999	Craig Valentine	Ellicott City, Maryland
2000	Ed Tate	Aurora, Colorado
2001	Darren LaCroix	Auburn, Massachusetts
2002	Dwayne Smith	Decatur, Georgia
2003	Jim Key	Rowlett, Texas
2004	Randy Harvey	Sherwood, Oregon
2005	Lance Miller	Glendale, California
2006	Edward Hearn	Chicago, Illinois
2007	Vikas Jhingran	Cambridge, Massachusetts
2008	LaShunda Rundles	Dallas, Texas
2009	Mark Hunter	Albany Creek, QLD, Australia
2010	David Henderson	San Antonio, Texas
2011	Jock Elliott	Bongaree, QLD, Australia
2012	Ryan Avery	Portland, Oregon
2013	Presiyan Vasilev	Chicago, Illinois
2014	Dananjaya Hettiarachchi	Nawala Rajagiriya, Sri Lanka
2015	Mohammed Qahtani	Dhahran, Saudi Arabia
2016	Darren Tay	Singapore
2017	Manoj Vasudevan	Singapore
2018	Ramona J. Smith	Cleveland, Ohio
2019	Aaron Beverly	Philadelphia, Pennsylvania
2020	Mike Carr	Austin, Texas
2021	Verity Price	Cape Town, South Africa
2022	Cyril Junior Dim	Wrocław, Poland
2023	Jocelyn Tyson	Mt. Laurel, New Jersey
2024	Luisa Montalvo	San Juan, Texas
2025	Sabyasachi Sengupta	Amsterdam, The Netherlands

== See also ==
- Public speaking
