= Speaking fee =

Payment for a public speaking event

A speaking fee is a payment awarded to an individual for speaking at a public event.

Motivational speakers, businesspersons, facilitators, and celebrities are able to garner significant earnings in speaking fees or honoraria. In 2013, $10,000 was considered a lower limit for speakers brokered by speakers bureaus, $40,000 a regular fee for well-known authors, and famous politicians were reported to charge about $100,000 and more.

In contrast, speakers in academic conferences and similar events rarely get significant speaking fees or any at all. Sometimes speakers will even pay for attending and presenting at a conference, although it is fairly common that they are rewarded with free attendance. Researchers and academics consider conference presentations an honour and necessary for their careers, rather than a service. Scientists who become popular authors or otherwise famous are an exception, and can earn similar sums as celebrities.

Prudence must be taken with speaker fees for government officials or employees or to scientific searchers as it may be considered as a bribery.
