= Keynote =

Talk that establishes an underlying theme

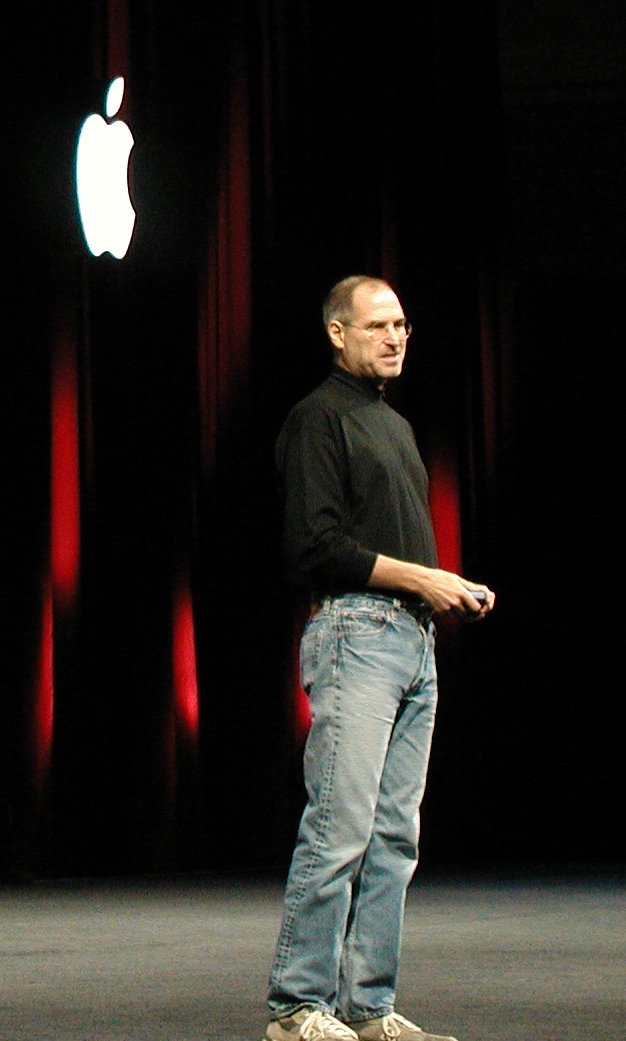
Steve Jobs was famous for his keynotes, dubbed Stevenotes.

A keynote in public speaking is a talk that establishes a main underlying theme. In corporate or commercial settings, greater importance is attached to the delivery of a keynote speech or keynote address. The keynote establishes the framework for the following programme of events or convention agenda; frequently the role of keynote speaker will include that of convention moderator. It will also flag up a larger idea—a literary story, an individual musical piece, or event.

At political or industrial conventions and expositions and at academic conferences, the keynote address or keynote speech is delivered to set the underlying tone and summarize the core message or most important revelation of the event. Keynote speeches are also given at the graduation and commencement ceremonies of colleges, universities, and major high schools, usually by accomplished academics or celebrities invited by the student body. These speeches are often called a commencement speech.

Keynote speakers are often selected to raise interest in a particular event, such as a conference or large meeting sponsored by a corporation or association, and draw attendees to attend that program. Selecting a keynote speaker who is well known for their expertise in a particular field, or who has wide name recognition due to other accomplishments, will probably raise enthusiasm among prospective attendees for a meeting or conference. Increasingly the word keynote is being used as a synonym for plenary session or "invited talk", with some conferences having an opening keynote, a closing keynote, and many other keynotes.

A keynote speaker may work independently or be represented by a speakers bureau. In the event that a speaker is represented by a traditional speakers bureau, a commission, typically 25%–30%, is due; however, this is traditionally and ethically absorbed by the speaker rather than the client so that the fee remains flat and transparently priced to the client.
