= Table topic =

Topics on various subjects discussed by the people around a table

Table topics are topics on various subjects that are discussed by a group of people around a table. As practiced by Toastmasters International, the topics to be discussed are written on pieces of paper which are placed in a box in the middle of a table. The participants pick up one paper each and start talking about the topic written on the paper. Speeches given by the persons are extemporaneous or Ad libitum. The purpose is to develop the speaking skills and thinking processes of a person.

Many personality or public speaking clubs like the 'Toastmasters' have a separate session in their meetings known as a table topic session. Time allotted to a person is two minutes. There will be a table topic master for each meeting, who will prepare questions beforehand and ask the participants questions one by one for which they are called upon to answer. Some chapters of Toastmasters also host Table Topics contests.

== See also ==
- TableTopics
