= Speaker of the House of Representatives =

Speaker of the House of Representatives may refer to:

== National governments ==
- Speaker of the House of Representatives (Antigua and Barbuda)
- Speaker of the Australian House of Representatives
- List of speakers of the House of Representatives of Belize
- Speaker of the House of Representatives of Burma
- Speaker of the House of Representatives of Egypt
- Speaker of the House of Representatives of Fiji
- Speaker of the House of Representatives of Grenada
- List of speakers of the House of Representatives of Jamaica
- Speaker of the House of Representatives of Japan
- List of speakers of the House of Representatives of Liberia
- Speaker of the House of Representatives of Malta
- Speaker of the House of Representatives (Netherlands)
- Speaker of the New Zealand House of Representatives
- Speaker of the Nigerian House of Representatives
- Speaker of the Philippine House of Representatives
- Speaker of the House of Representatives of Thailand
- Speaker of the House of Representatives of Trinidad and Tobago
- Speaker of the United States House of Representatives

== American regional governments ==
=== States ===
- Speaker of the Alabama House of Representatives
- Speaker of the Alaska House of Representatives
- Speaker of the Arizona House of Representatives
- Speaker of the Arkansas House of Representatives
- Speaker of the California House of Representatives
- Speaker of the Colorado House of Representatives
- Speaker of the Connecticut House of Representatives
- Speaker of the Delaware House of Representatives
- Speaker of the Florida House of Representatives
- Speaker of the Georgia House of Representatives
- Speaker of the Hawaii House of Representatives
- Speaker of the Idaho House of Representatives
- Speaker of the Illinois House of Representatives
- Speaker of the Indiana House of Representatives
- Speaker of the Iowa House of Representatives
- Speaker of the Kansas House of Representatives
- Speaker of the Kentucky House of Representatives
- Speaker of the Louisiana House of Representatives
- Speaker of the Maine House of Representatives
- Speaker of the Maryland House of Representatives
- Speaker of the Massachusetts House of Representatives
- Speaker of the Michigan House of Representatives
- Speaker of the Minnesota House of Representatives
- Speaker of the Mississippi House of Representatives
- Speaker of the Missouri House of Representatives
- Speaker of the Montana House of Representatives
- Speaker of the Nebraska House of Representatives
- Speaker of the Nevada House of Representatives
- Speaker of the New Hampshire House of Representatives
- Speaker of the New Jersey House of Representatives
- Speaker of the New Mexico House of Representatives
- Speaker of the New York House of Representatives
- Speaker of the North Carolina House of Representatives
- Speaker of the North Dakota House of Representatives
- Speaker of the Ohio House of Representatives
- Speaker of the Oklahoma House of Representatives
- Speaker of the Oregon House of Representatives
- Speaker of the Pennsylvania House of Representatives
- Speaker of the Rhode Island House of Representatives
- Speaker of the South Carolina House of Representatives
- Speaker of the South Dakota House of Representatives
- Speaker of the Tennessee House of Representatives
- Speaker of the Texas House of Representatives
- Speaker of the Utah House of Representatives
- Speaker of the Vermont House of Representatives
- Speaker of the Virginia House of Representatives
- Speaker of the Washington House of Representatives
- Speaker of the West Virginia House of Representatives
- Speaker of the Wyoming House of Representatives

=== Territories ===
- List of speakers of the House of Representatives of the Northern Mariana Islands
- Speaker of the House of Representatives of Puerto Rico

== See also ==
- Dean of the House, the member with the longest continuous record of service in some legislatures
- Father of the House, a title unofficially bestowed on certain members of some legislatures
- List of current presidents of legislatures
- List of speakers of the House of Representatives of Somaliland
- Speaker (disambiguation)
