= Speaking Circles =

Speaking Circles are small groups of 8-10 people who come together to feel at ease in public speaking. Originally developed in America as a way to combat stage fright, independent practitioners also report successful applications to treating stuttering and other social challenges.

== History ==
Speaking Circles were developed in the late 1970s by former stand-up comedian Lee Glickstein, who codified the methods he found successful in addressing his own experience of stage fright. Subsequently, Glickstein registered the name Speaking Circles as a trademark and incorporated a business, Speaking Circles International, to deliver training using his methods through a network of licensed facilitators.

== Relational Presence ==
The core of Glickstein's method is a state of mind he calls Relational Presence, something he describes as "a state of receptivity to another without agenda or effort."

Traditional oratory and rhetorical approaches to public speaking highlight performance as a key to engaging and holding an audience. Metaphorically, speakers are seen as connecting with their audiences by 'reaching out' to them through compelling words, gestures and arguments.

In contrast, speakers applying Relational Presence techniques invite connection by establishing a sense of intimate safety. The speaker and each audience member understand that it's OK to simply be themselves and no performance is required.

The most usual method of a speaker establishing Relational Presence with an audience is through non-threatening eye contact made by the speaker with individual members of the audience, and held for longer than usual periods of time (usually a minimum of few seconds for each audience member engaged in this way).
