= Glossophobia =

Fear of public speaking

- Other names: Speech anxiety, Public speaking anxiety
- Specialty: Psychology

Glossophobia or Speech anxiety is the fear of public speaking. The word glossophobia derives from the Greek γλῶσσα glossa (tongue) and φόβος phobos (fear or dread). The causes of glossophobia are uncertain but explanations include communibiology and the illusion of transparency. Further explanations range from nervousness produced by a lack of preparation to social anxiety disorder (SAD), one of the most common psychiatric disorders.

Its symptoms include one or more physiological changes, mental disruptions, and detrimental speech performance. There are several ways to overcome glossophobia, which include preparation and rehearsing, deconstructing beliefs, engaging in positive self-talk, visualizing optimal performance, practicing mindfulness, breathing exercises, creating an anxiety hierarchy, using virtual reality, computerized coaches and medications such as beta-blockers.

== Causes ==
Considerable research has been conducted into the causes of glossophobia, with a number of potential causes being suggested. One proposed explanation is that these anxieties are a specific symptom of social anxiety produced by fearfulness related to the fight-or-flight response, which is produced by a perceived threat; this triggers an elevated defense reaction in the sympathetic nervous system to be alert, to run, hide or freeze. It is linked to the psychiatric condition known as social anxiety disorder (SAD) which is a mental predisposition to believe that social interactions will result in harsh negative judgement from others and poor outcomes because of such judgement; thus, before the social interaction occurs such as a public speech, the individual creates negative thoughts of failure, dread and the idea of being incapable, producing negative feelings and physiological responses.

Individuals who suffer from SAD engage in negative visualization and self-talk which halt their attention and ability to stay focused and drain their cognitive power and physical energy. People suffering from SAD believe they are just not good at public speaking, setting a belief as a fact and falling victim to a popular psychological phenomenon known as self-fulfilling prophecy. Moreover, individuals with SAD add more mental pressure because they commonly expect others to like them or accept them, measure their self-worth by their social interaction performance, and believe that showing emotions is the same as showing weakness.

A study with 59 individuals diagnosed with SAD and 63 non-anxious individuals in which they were engaged in an unexpected public speech, received standardized positive or neutral feedback and were asked to recall their positive feedback five minutes later and one week after their unexpected performance. Individuals suffering from SAD recalled their feedback less positively than what it had been, whereas some non-anxious individuals even recalled their feedback more positively suggesting a self-protective drive to maintain their self-esteem.

In addition, other key causes of this anxiety have been identified as the novelty of the experience, the characteristics of the audience, the illusion of transparency and the degree to which the speaker identifies public speaking as a performance as opposed to an act of communication.

== Symptoms ==
The more specific symptoms of speech anxiety can be grouped into three categories: physical, verbal, and non-verbal. Physical symptoms include: shaking, sweating, butterflies in the stomach, dry mouth, and rapid heartbeats. As Garcia-Lopez (2013) has noted, symptoms can include acute hearing, increased heart rate and blood pressure, dilated pupils, increased perspiration and oxygen intake, stiffening of neck/upper back muscles, and dry mouth. Uncontrollable shaking is also common and often occurs prior to the phobia-eliciting stimulus. Verbal symptoms include (but are not limited to) a tense or quivering voice, and vocalized pauses known as vocal fillers or speech disfluency. Nonverbal symptoms could include going blank during the speech, and remaining dependent on note cards.

== Help and relief ==
Training courses in public speaking and/or organizations such as Australian Rostrum, Toastmasters International, POWERtalk International, and Association of Speakers Clubs or cultural activities at school level can help people to reduce their fear of public speaking to manageable levels.

In some cases, anxiety can be mitigated by a speaker not attempting to resist their anxiety, thus fortifying the anxiety/fight-or-flight loop. Other strategies involve using one's nervousness to enliven an otherwise fearful speech presentation.

Traditional advice has been to urge fearful speakers not to take themselves too seriously, and to be reminded that mistakes are often unnoticed by audiences. Gaining experience in public speaking often results in it becoming less anxiety-provoking over time. Recent studies suggest that there is a close link between fear of public speaking and self-efficacy and that attempts to help presenters improve their self-efficacy will also reduce this fear.

Loosening up a "tough crowd" by asking questions promotes audience participation. A speaker may also find this exercise to be helpful when their mind "goes blank", as it gives them time to regain their train of thought.

=== Medication ===
Beta-blockers are commonly prescribed off-label to mitigate the immediate physical reactions associated with anxiety, including glossophobia. These medications act by blocking the effects of adrenaline, thereby reducing symptoms such as rapid heartbeat, trembling, and sweating. Propranolol, in particular, has been noted for its efficacy in managing stage fright and is widely used among performers and public speakers.

Benzodiazepines (e.g., lorazepam, clonazepam) are fast-acting anxiolytics medications that can help in acute, high-stress situations. They function by enhancing the effect of the neurotransmitter GABA, producing a calming effect. However, they carry risks of toxicity and physical dependency, and are generally reserved for short-term or occasional use.

Selective Serotonin Reuptake Inhibitors (SSRIs), including sertraline and paroxetine, are commonly prescribed for generalized social anxiety disorder. These medications work by increasing serotonin levels in the brain, which can help improve mood and reduce anxiety over time. Unlike beta-blockers and benzodiazepines, SSRIs require several weeks to achieve therapeutic effects and are typically used as long-term treatment options.

=== Psychotherapy ===
Cognitive Behavioral Therapy (CBT) is a widely recognized and effective treatment for glossophobia, particularly when the condition is associated with social anxiety disorder. CBT focuses on identifying and challenging negative thought patterns associated with public speaking anxiety, and replacing them with more positive and realistic beliefs. The approach often includes exposure therapy, in which individuals confront feared social situations either through real-life exposure (in vivo) or imagined scenarios (in vitro), to reduce anxiety and improve their public speaking performance.

While CBT has demonstrated effectiveness, both in vivo and in vitro exposure methods can present challenges, such as high time and resource requirements, limited environmental control, and difficulties some individuals face in visualizing anxiety-provoking situations. One study reported that CBT combined with virtual reality exposure significantly reduced public speaking anxiety, with improvements maintained at a three-month follow-up. Another study found that while both CBT and VRCBT significantly reduced public speaking anxiety, twice as many clients dropped out of CBT (15) than from VRCBT (6).

==== Virtual reality exposure therapy (VRET) ====
As an alternative to in vivo and in vitro exposure therapy, VRET has emerged as an effective intervention for individuals experiencing glossophobia and it overcomes some of the limitations of traditional CBT. VRET simulates public speaking scenarios and evokes anxiety responses comparable to real-world experiences, enabling gradual desensitization within a safe setting.

Recent technological advancements have enabled the development of self-guided and automated VRET platforms that do not require direct clinician involvement. Growing evidence supports the effectiveness of such approaches, where one study found that self-guided VRET produced similar reductions in public speaking anxiety compared to those achieved through therapist-led sessions.

Innovations in VRET design have focused on user engagement. Dr. Chris Macdonald from the University of Cambridge developed an open-access VR platform compatible with smartphones, headsets and laptops. The system immerses users in simulated speaking environments with gradual exposure to anxiety-inducing stimuli, ranging from small classrooms to large stadium with 10,000 highly-distracting virtual spectators. A single 30 minute session experiment with 29 adolescents reported a substantial reduction in public speaking anxiety using the VR platform.

While most research on VRET for glossophobia has focused on adult populations, there are studies targeting adolescents, who may be less likely to seek formal treatment for anxiety-related issues. A gamified VRET program was developed specifically for teenagers, combining traditional exposure techniques with game elements such as rewards, goal-setting, and challenges to enhance engagement and reduce dropout rates. A pilot study found that this approach led to significant reductions in public speaking anxiety compared to a waitlist control group, highlighting the potential of gamification to enhance both engagement and treatment outcomes in teenagers.

== Epidemiology ==
In academic settings, glossophobia is particularly prevalent. A study conducted among university students in the United States found that 64% of participants experienced fear of public speaking, and approximately 90% expressed a desire for their undergraduate curriculum to include courses aimed at enhancing public speaking skills.

== See also ==
- Telephone phobia

== Bibliography ==
- Rothwell, J. Dan. In The Company of Others: An Introduction to Communication. New York: McGraw Hill, 2004.
