= Luisa Montalvo =

American public speaker

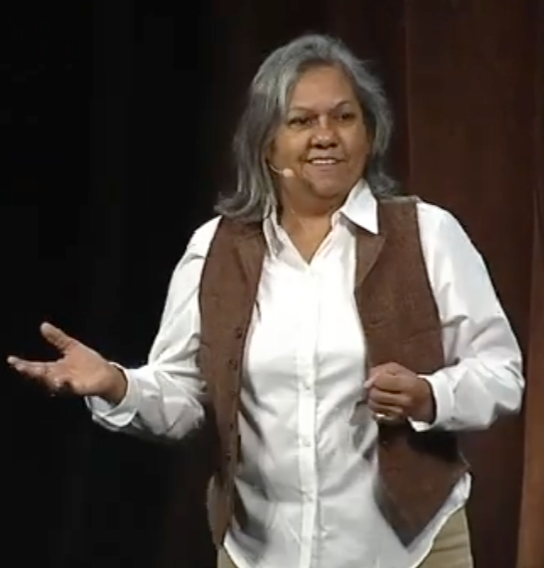
- At the 2019 World Championship of Public Speaking
- Occupations: Motivational speaker, keynote speaker, dog rescue volunteer
- Years active: 2010s–present
- Known for: Winner of the 2024 Toastmasters World Championship of Public Speaking
- Notable work: "37 Strangers" (award-winning speech)

Luisa Montalvo is an American motivational speaker, public keynote speaker and dog rescue volunteer. She rose to prominence and limelight after winning the 2024 World Championship of Public Speaking at the age of 65.

== Biography ==
She currently resides in San Juan, Texas, USA. She uses a wheelchair after being involving in an accident around 2022.

== Career ==
Montalvo is hailed as a prolific Toastmasters speaker for over a decade and has been an integral part of Hub City Toastmasters. She has also volunteered as a keynote speaker for other Toastmasters clubs.

She participated at the 2024 World Championship of Public Speaking and progressed all the way to the final after confronting a stiff competition throughout the contest as she competed against seven other finalists after a set of several elimination rounds. She was adjudged and crowned as the world champion of public speaking during the 2024 Toastmasters International's 100th Anniversary Convention which was held in Anaheim, California. She crafted the title winning speech "37 Strangers" based on true- and real-life incidents which had an ever lasting impact on her. Her speech also articulated the near death experience she encountered after miraculously surviving from a life-threatening accident and delved further about how she went through the rehabilitation process aftermath the fatal accident to return to her normal lifestyle. Her speech "37 Strangers" which she delivered during the final of the 2024 World Championship of Public Speaking also gave a glimpse of the learning curve as far as Luisa was concerned as she brought out the elements of risk and the important healing process which she underwent after the accident and the in-depth speech was eventually recognised as a thought provoking, inspiring and powerful speech by the contest chair in order to be conferred with the prestigious award.

Montalvo's award-winning speech "37 Strangers" was also a fitting tribute to the team of 37 emergency and medical professionals who rescued her life from the fatal accident and she recalled how her heart stopped beating for six minutes after the accident. Montalvo also used humour to indicate the agony of those six minutes of her life as the "best sleep she had ever had in her lifetime", as her metaphorical reference despite the gravity of the situation brought in thunderous applauds and laugh riot among the capacity crowd which was present in the auditorium to witness the Toastmasters International's World Championship of Public Speaking final. Her speech also summed up the paramount importance of team unity, coordination and strategic collaboration by giving insightful analysis recalling the sequence of events which unfolded after she met with the accident when a team of 37 medical professionals came together as one unit to safeguard her life. She pointed out "If 37 people can come together in unity and put all this energy into me, can you imagine what all of us could accomplish? All it takes is treating each other with dignity and worth."
