= Communibiology =

Research paradigm

Communibiology is a term referring to a research paradigm that emphasizes the "neurobiological foundations of human communication behavior". Communibiologists take the nature side of the nature versus nurture debate in communication development. The communibiological paradigm was developed by Beatty and McCroskey as an alternative to the nature side supporting social learning paradigm. They believe genetics to be far more important in the development of communication behavior than learning processes and the environment. These researchers do concede, however, that genetic factors are not the sole source of communication behavior. One accepted ratio is 20% influence of cultural, situational, or environmental stimuli and 80% influence of inborn, neurobiological structures on behavior.

A main idea of communibiology is that temperaments are based on genetics and not learned. Communication behavior is an expression of a person's temperament, though the behavior and the temperament do not completely correlate with one another. Identical genetics producing identical temperaments may result in non-identical communication behaviors because one's temperament can be expressed in various ways. The behaviors, though, will be very similar.

== Influences on the communibiological paradigm ==
=== Hans Eysenck's personality theory ===
Hans Eysenck found that the two main aspects of personality are temperament and intelligence. He identified three personality types:

- Extraversion –sociable, lively, active, assertive, sensation-seeking, carefree dominant, surgent and venturesome.
- Neuroticism – anxious, depressed, guilt feelings, low self-esteem, tense, irrational, shy, moody emotional.
- Psychoticism – aggressive, cold, ego-centric, impersonal, impulsive, antisocial, unempathic, creative, and tough-minded.

Eysenck argues that these three personalities are inherited lending it useful to the communibiological paradigm. Other research has also found that the genetic component of these three personalities is between 50% and 80%.

=== J.A. Gray's theory of neuropsychology of temperament ===
J.A. Gray proposed a behavioral inhibition system (BIS) and a behavioral activation system (BAS). The threshold for activation of the BIS or BAS is inherited.

=== Cary Horvath's twins study ===
Horvath compared identical and fraternal twins in order to determine if communicator styles were inherited. This was the first study of heredity and communication and it found that communicator style variables are partially inherited, leading the way for the future studies regarding inheritance and communication behavior.

== Model for communibiological research (as used by Beatty, et al.) ==
1. Select or create a theory that proposes an explanation for an aspect of human communication behavior.
2. Relate the theory to specific biological elements or processes.
3. Select or create a measure related to those biological elements or processes.
4. Establish a relationship between the measurements, human communication behavior, and biological elements or processes.

== Opponents ==
There exist many opponents to the communibiological paradigm. First are the "nurture" and social learning paradigm supporters that believe learning has more to do with communication behavior than genetics. Then there are others who believe the whole argument is pointless. Condit calls for a multi-causal model that would incorporate both nature and nurture. Condit also claims that the 80% genetic influence found by Beatty and McCroskey lacks solid evidence and a number in the 40-60% range is more likely, helping to support her view of incorporating both nature and nurture.

== Communibiological perspective on communication apprehension ==
Communication apprehension afflicts millions of people worldwide. Much of the communibiological research conducted in the area of communication apprehension has found that many causes of the affliction are inherited.

=== Beatty and McCroskey ===
Beatty and McCroskey first developed their communibiological paradigm in order to more effectively diagnose communication apprehension. Using Eysenck's personality theory they identified the primary components of communication apprehension to be introversion and neuroticism. They also used Gray's theory to say that activation of the behavioral inhibition system is related to anxiety. They make note that both the personalities of Eysenck's theory and the activation threshold of the BIS in Gray's theory have been found to be inherited. Differences in communication apprehension correspond to differences in BIS activation threshold, supporting the idea that communication apprehension is genetically determined.

=== Interpersonal communication motives ===
Interpersonal communication motives explain why people with communication apprehension communicate the way they do. People with low communication apprehension communicate for pleasure, affection, control, and relaxation while people with high communication apprehension communicate for inclusion and escape. Paulsel and Mottet (2004) found that interpersonal communication motives such as these are at least a partially influenced by genetically inherited traits.

=== Communication apprehension in second languages ===
Jung and McCroskey (2004) studied the presence of communication apprehension in those speaking their first language and those speaking their second language. Communication apprehension in the first language predicted communication apprehension in the second language. This combated the social learning perspective which would say that the learning of the second language would influence and change the communication apprehension in the second language. They concluded that communication apprehension is a cross-linguistic trait and that the trait is genetically inherited.

=== Treatment ===
The fact that the causes of communication apprehension are inherited has major implications in how it can be treated as some believe that if communication apprehension is genetically inherited then it cannot be changed. Others contend, as Beatty and McCroskey did, that since traits are not exclusively genetically inherited, treatment is viable. Treatment in terms of the communibiological paradigm involves learning to control the negative aspects of one's inherited temperament.

== The role of culture ==
Comminubiologists argue that people are born with specific temperaments based on their genetics. This does not, however, mean that they do not learn. Culture plays an important role in this learning process. While they are born with a certain temperament a person learns how to respond to specific temperamental demands based on the culture they are surrounded by. As children they learn which temperamental actions are appropriate and which are not. So while the basis of a person's communication behavior is based on genetics, a good portion of their behavior is also affected by the culture they are raised in. In fact, the communication behaviors ethnocentrism and homophobia were found to have no relationship with a person's genetic make-up or temperament. These traits are instead developed through culture.

== See also ==
- Biosemiotics
- Semiotics of culture
