= Executive communication =

Message sent to the Senate by the President

In the United States federal government, executive communication is a message sent to the Senate by the President or other executive branch official. An example of executive communication is a presidential veto message.
