= Toastmaster (magazine) =

Monthly magazine published by Toastmasters

Toastmaster (sometimes called "Toastmaster Magazine" or "The Toastmaster") is a monthly magazine published by Toastmasters International. The magazine promotes the ideas and goals of Toastmasters International. The publisher is Toastmasters International Inc., based in Rancho Santa Margarita, CA.
