= Native Speaker =

Native Speaker may refer to:

- Native Speaker (novel), a 1995 novel by Chang-Rae Lee
- Native Speaker (album), a 2011 album by Canadian band Braids
- Native speaker, a person using their first language or mother tongue
- Native speaker (by proficiency), a person who has achieved the highest level of proficiency in a language, meeting all linguistic, grammatical, and cultural benchmarks of a native speaker, regardless of age of acquisition
