= Speakers' Corner (disambiguation) =

A Speakers' Corner is an outdoor area for public speaking.

Speakers' Corner may also refer to:

- Speakers' Corner (TV series), Canadian television series
- Speakers' Corner, Singapore, in Hong Lim Park
- Speakers' Corner, Hyde Park, London, England
