= Chinese rhetoric =

Scholars studying Chinese rhetoric often analyze through general rhetorical principles, diction and organization, rhetorical devices, and genres and styles. These four categories provide a framework for understanding how rhetorical practices have been discussed in Chinese philosophical writings, literary texts, and modern scholarly studies.

The sources of Chinese rhetorical tradition are subject to a scholarly debate. Some researchers assert that the rhetoric as an academic discipline was introduced to China through Western influence in the early twentieth century, while others argue the indigenous Chinese rhetoric existed in China since ancient times, with most scholars looking for its roots in the Spring and Autumn Period.

Chinese theories of persuasive communication have had a significant influence on this practice of social engagement. Since rhetorical contexts vary across different times and cultures, rhetorical traditions of ancient China—which have developed over more than five millennia—are deeply reflective of its social dynamics and epistemological frameworks. In each dynasty in Chinese history, its societal rhetorical value can be influenced by poets, speakers, and philosophers, who proposed and promoted it. In comparison to the Western persuasion of art, which in general prefers utilitarian and modern cultural values, Chinese persuasive rhetoric relies more on relational terms and social status to add to credibility.

== Historical Development ==
=== Classical Chinese rhetorical traditions ===
Nature philosophy is important in Chinese persuasion of art. It can be demonstrated in the rhetorical theories proposed by different figures throughout the ancient dynasties in Chinese history. There is a list of rhetorical traditions and principals, brought up by important figures throughout of Chinese history, that echoes the core of Chinese rhetorical values.

Confucius (孔子 551 BCE-479 BCE) is one of the most well-known examples. He emphasized “Ren 仁” (Ren is a Confucian idea that means kindness and care for other people) as one of the 25 essential virtues in ancient China, and he advocated that the rulers were expected to refine their moral character to serve as a role model for society. By doing so, they would inspire the spirits of respect, dignity, and obedience among the people, fostering socio-cultural harmony. His teachings reflect implicit rhetorical principals, particularly the use of ethos. (character and credibility)

=== Late Qing and Republican transformations ===
During the late Qing dynasty and Republican time in China (1840 CE-1949 CE), Western knowledge and educational systems were introduced. It caused significant changes to the concept of Chinese rhetoric. The concept of rhetoric began to be translated and studied as an academic subject known as xiucixue (修辞学). At the same time, the educational reforms and language teaching played an important role in the development of modern rhetorical studies in China. Scholars translated Western rhetorical theories and incorporated them into Chinese language education and writing instruction. As a result, rhetoric gradually became an organized field of study in modern Chinese universities and textbooks. Some scholars consider that the period marked an important transition in which rhetorical theory was increasingly discussed in relation to writing instruction and linguistic analysis.

=== Contemporary and political rhetoric ===
In the twentieth century (after 1949 CE), rhetoric (修辞学) in China was also shaped by political discourse and mass communication. During the Mao era, political language played an important role in public life, particularly through speeches, propaganda, and political campaigns. The rhetorical strategies were used to mobilize public support in political speech. The political rhetoric frequently relied on slogans and simplified language. Famous examples include political slogans such as “Serve the People,” which emphasized ideological commitment and collective identity.

At the same time, contemporary Chinese rhetoric has also focused on writing practices and rhetorical devices in texts. The research of Chinese expository writing have identified frequent use of rhetorical techniques such as metaphor, simile, quotation, hyperbole, and rhetorical questions.
