= Rhetoric of social intervention model =

The "rhetoric of social intervention" (RSI) model is a systemic communication theory of how human beings symbolically constitute, maintain, and change social systems (e.g., organizations, societies, and cultures). The RSI model was developed in the writings of communication theorist William R. Brown.

The model provides a framework for analyzing and interpreting social system change and its side effects from a communication perspective. It also suggests a methodology for acting as an intervener to encourage and/or discourage social system change. The model offers an alternative approach to understanding social system change by its emphasis on communication as the driver of change in contrast to models that focus on social, political, economic, and technological forces as catalysts for change.

The RSI model is envisioned as three communication subsystems that function as starting points for interpreting or enacting social system change. The subsystems, known as attention, power, and need, form the RSI model framework. This entry describes the assumptive foundations of the RSI model. Then it discusses the attention, power, and need patterns of communication that that model identifies as points for generating social system change and continuity.

== RSI model foundations ==
The beginnings of Brown's RSI model are reflected in three main documents—a book about Will Rogers that reports research on American dream ideology, a book chapter that outlines how human beings strategically use symbols to create, maintain, and change symbolic realities, and a journal article in which he sketches the RSI model foundations by theorizing about the process by which human beings strategically use symbols to create, maintain, and change symbolically constructed ideology.

=== American Dream ideology ===
Imagemaker: Will Rogers and the American Dream was based on Brown's doctoral dissertation. An Oklahoman like Rogers, Brown was curious about Rogers' influence and popularity in the 1920s and 1930s. Brown researched the source of Rogers' ability to be persuasive and authoritative and concluded that it arose from Rogers' ability to embody and reflect characteristics that the U.S. public associated with the American dream. The book describes American dream attributes, such as "the dream of the dignity and worth of the individual, of freedom and equality, of success, and of progress," and shows how Rogers symbolically identified with them. Although Brown acquired an in-depth understanding of American dream ideology, he later reported that the research left him wondering how social systems construct ideology. To address this question, Brown began reading books and articles on language, philosophy, rhetoric, and linguistics.

=== The naming process ===
A book chapter called Language and Strategy, written for The Rhetorical Dialogue: Contemporary Concepts and Cases, reflects Brown's initial investigations into the process by which human beings symbolically constitute reality, and, by extension, ideology. The chapter describes how human beings learn to categorize experience symbolically and how this symbolizing activity functions rhetorically. Brown draws his ideas for what he calls the "naming" process from scholars such as rhetorical theorist Kenneth Burke, philosopher Susanne Langer, psycholinguist Roger Brown, and psychologists Jerome Bruner, Jacqueline Goodnow, and George Austin.

Brown, building on the ideas of Roger Brown, says that human beings learn to name, or to transform experience into symbols, from language tutors, such as parents, peers, educators, and the media. He argues that human beings create names by abstracting from experience and then classifying those abstractions as "same as" or "different from" other symbolic categorizations for experience. Brown urges that all names are incomplete—as abstractions, they simultaneously direct attention to certain parts of experience and away from other parts of experience.

Brown suggests that all names create expectancies about experience. He argues that this enables human beings to use names rhetorically to clarify ambiguous experience, to suggest approach or avoidance behavior toward experience, and to unite and divide experience. For example, naming a person's actions as "terrorism" clarifies the experience, suggests avoidance behavior, and divides that experience from ones named "guerilla warfare."

Brown closes the chapter by outlining what he calls the "rhetorical reasoning" process by which human beings advocate for their particular ways of naming experience. The process involves proposing a name, explaining how the name fits the experience, and then suggesting the expected response to experience based on the proposed name. Brown notes that in these discussions, negotiations, agreements, and disagreements about the symbolic classification of experience, human beings create symbolic reality.

=== The ideology process ===
In the article Ideology as Communication Process published in the Quarterly Journal of Speech, Brown merges his research in ideology and symbolic categorization to propose a model to describe the rhetorical process by which human beings create, maintain, and change ideology, and by extension, social systems. In two later articles, Brown refers to this model as the "rhetoric of social intervention." In the Ideology article, Brown argues that the communication and creation of ideology occur simultaneously and, although a specific ideology might fade, the communication process of constituting, maintaining, and changing ideology is continuous. The RSI model directs attention to the continuous communication process that underlies social change and continuity.

Brown defines ideology as "any symbolic construction of the world in whose superordinate 'name' human beings can comprehensively order their experience and subsume their specific activities." In essence, he views ideology as an ultimate symbolic categorization of all of experience that both creates and is shaped by a social system. Ideology is an overarching name that influences how social system participants make sense of their world, social hierarchy, and needs. At the same time, ideology emerges when participants symbolically constitute worldview, power, and need. For example, according to the RSI model, American dream ideology influences how U.S. Americans interpret their needs and roles in society, e.g., they need "freedom." The actions they take toward achieving "freedom" also create American dream ideology.

Extending Roger Brown, the RSI model holds that human beings learn ideology from language tutors. As they learn specific names for experience, they also learn the attributes and expectancies associated with the social system's symbolically constructed ideology. For example, the U.S. social system often identifies attributes such as individualism, freedom, equality, success, and progress with American dream ideology. American dream ideology creates the expectancy that a more perfect life can be achieved by pursuing those attributes. Brown theorizes that human beings construct ideology to meet an inherent human need for an ultimate sense of order, meaning, and explanation for all of experience. Thus, he identifies "ultimacy" as the primary attribute of ideology to distinguish it from names given to everyday experience. He writes that ideology is "that category of experience on which one is willing to bet the meaning of one's life."

In the RSI model, ideology arises out of the naming process. Human beings create ideology by abstracting from and naming sensed and non-sensed experience. The model focuses on the symbolic abstraction process associated with the naming of worldview, relationships, and needs. The model refers to these three symbolic subsystems as attention, power, and need. Brown proposes that the subsystems are holistically interconnected, so that change in one brings about simultaneous change in the other two. Hence, the RSI model provides a systemic, or what Brown later calls a "holographic," approach to understanding social system change.

According to the RSI model, because ideology, like all names for experience, is abstractive, all ideologies are incomplete. Brown theorizes that human beings adhere to an ideology as long as it seems to make comprehensive sense of experience. The model predicts that because ideology is always incomplete, adherents will encounter anomalies—experiences that violate or do not fit ideological expectancies. Human beings have an inherent need to avoid a sense of chaos or uncertainty, so they must find a way to account for or make sense of the anomalies to maintain a sense of order and meaning in life. Thus, Brown argues that the symbolic process by which human beings create and maintain ideology is paradoxically the same process that enables them to account rhetorically for the anomalies. He concludes that rhetorical interventions to address anomalies drive social system change.

The RSI model directs attention to the rhetorical process by which human beings deal with anomalies by focusing on communication patterns associated with the symbolic construction of attention, power, and need. Brown views each of these symbolic subsystems as a starting point for analyzing and initiating communication interventions to promote and impede ideological and, by extension, social system change.

== Attention interventions ==
The Ideology article refers to the attention subsystem as "input-switching." Two later articles call the subsystem "attention." In the RSI model, as human beings symbolically construct ideology, they create complex naming patterns to make sense of and interpret experience. They symbolically constitute templates or worldviews that give meaning to daily experience. They create these complex naming patterns (e.g., a good education will lead to a better life) by abstracting, or paying attention to some aspects of experience (foregrounding) and directing attention away from other aspects (backgrounding). Attention interventions occur when human beings attempt to account for anomalies in their complex naming patterns by communicatively shifting attention. Brown concludes that these rhetorical shifts in attention drive social system change.

In the Attention and the Rhetoric of Social Intervention article, Brown describes in detail the attention intervention aspect of the RSI model. The RSI model holds that complex naming patterns create expectancies about experience (e.g., that getting a good education will make life better). But when lived experience fails to match the symbolically created expectancy (e.g., a person with a good education cannot find a job), the model suggests that human beings may become more attentive to anomalies in their naming pattern. Furthermore, the more widely human beings apply their naming patterns, the more likely they will encounter anomalies because all naming patterns are abstractions, or incomplete. Because human beings are assumed to have an inherent need for order and to make sense of experience, the model predicts that human beings will attempt to compensate symbolically for these anomalies.

In the model, human beings communicatively promote or impede "attention switches" to compensate for anomalies so as to maintain meaning and order in their lives. Attention switching involves a symbolic recategorizing of experience or a renaming of the expectancies associated with a symbolic category. Attention switching occurs when human beings rhetorically shift what they attend to in experience. For example, instead of foregrounding education as the means to making a better life, they might shift to foregrounding spiritual development as the means to achieve a better life. Alternatively human beings could redefine "good education" as meaning only private education instead of all education. In both cases, the RSI model would say that human beings shifted attention to make sense of the anomaly in the "good education" template.

According to the RSI model, the conditions for an attention switch exist when there are two or more complex naming patterns that can make sense of experience and a systemic shift occurs from one template to another. Attention interventions involve cycles of increased and decreased communication related to anomalies. In the cycle, (1) human beings communicatively increase attention to deviance between symbolically created expectancies and lived experience (anomalies), (2) they increasingly advocate alternative ways of knowing, being, and valuing to account for the anomalies, and (3) their openness to these alternative complex names to regain a sense of order and meaning increases. In the Attention article, Brown demonstrates RSI model concepts by examining the symbolic creation of the scientific worldview. He also applies the RSI model to identify attention switch cycles that generated social system shifts in U.S. black/white relationships from 1919 to 1965.

The RSI model suggests that to promote an attention switch, interveners (persons attempting to bring about or prevent social change) communicatively feature attention to anomalies in currently held complex names. They advocate an alternative template that foregrounds aspects of experience that had been backgrounded in the currently held complex name. Their symbols mask attention to anomalies in the proposed naming pattern. Interveners that are attempting to prevent social system change communicatively feature attention to anomalies in the proposed template and mask attention to anomalies in the currently held naming pattern.

During an attention switch, experience itself is assumed not to change. What changes is how human beings symbolically categorize the experience. Although experience does not change, the RSI model suggests that it appears different because of concurrent shifts in interpretations of power and need. The shift to a new worldview brings about corresponding shifts in symbolic categorizations of needs and power relationships as well as an alternative social system future.

The RSI model predicts that after human beings shift attention to a new naming pattern, they eventually will also encounter anomalies in that pattern itself because all naming patterns are incomplete. The cycle of attention switching will begin again. Thus, although the content of a naming pattern may change, the communication process of creating, maintaining and changing naming patterns is continuous.

In the RSI model, the attention subsystem is one starting point for the rhetorical analysis of or the intervention in social system change. Alternatively, social change can also be examined from the starting point of the symbolic construction of power.

== Power interventions ==
The Ideology article refers to the power subsystem as "interpersonal categorizing." Two later articles call the subsystem "power." In the RSI model, human beings are interdependent with others in the symbolic construction and sharing of needs and power. The model holds that social systems arise out of the naming of relationships. Human beings interpersonally categorize to create and reify roles, social hierarchy, and relationship rules. In creating social order, human beings also create ideology. At the same time, ideology influences the social system participants' assumptions about social hierarchy. Power interventions occur when human beings attempt to account for anomalies in symbolically created hierarchy. These rhetorical interventions drive social system change and continuity.

In the Power and the Rhetoric of Social Intervention article, Brown describes in detail the power intervention aspect of the RSI model. Brown defines power as the degree to which human beings feel interdependent with others in fulfilling needs and in choosing futures. In the RSI model, human beings form power-sharing social systems in which they share responsibility for meeting needs and making choices that shape the social system's future. The RSI model treats power as a communication medium that provides rules or power codes for taking actions and/or making decisions without deliberation. Brown posits that relational names communicate what sociologist Niklas Luhmann calls "power codes" that shape relationship participants' choices and behaviors. For example, in the relational name "teacher/student," students typically choose to follow the teacher's direction, such as doing homework, because of social system expectancies associated with that relationship. At the same time, teachers usually follow the social system's expected rules for behavior, such as treating all students fairly.

According to the model, human beings create power through communication by symbolically constituting relationships. They create relationships by naming people as "same as" or "different from" each other and acting as if those similarities and differences are real and have meaning. As human beings learn relational names from language tutors, they learn expectancies the social system associates with those names. Thus, in the model, relational names are non-sensed or symbolic abstractions, which human beings make real in how they behave toward others and in objects created to represent relational names. For example, the stripes on a person's shirt and the social expectation that this person will salute officers make real the symbolic category "sergeant."

The RSI model holds that social hierarchy arises out of naming relationships "same" and "different." In the model, relational names that emphasize similarities between self and other are called "complementary" (e.g., friends, coworkers). These names convey the expectancy of equality. Relational names that emphasize differences are called "reciprocal" (e.g., winner/loser, coach/player). These names convey the expectancy of inequality. Social hierarchy is composed of complementary and reciprocal relationships. The social hierarchy becomes a symbolic reality when human beings act as if these relationships are real and that their expectancies have power.

According to the model, when expectancies associated with relational names are violated, conditions for a power intervention exist. For example, if the teacher does not treat students fairly, the students might attempt a power intervention by complaining to the teacher's superior or by dropping the class. More specifically, power interventions involve cycles of attention shifts from cooperation to maintain the current social hierarchy to competition by offering an alternative hierarchy, and vice versa. In the cycle, (1) human beings communicatively increase attention to anomalies in social hierarchy, (2) they increasingly advocate alternative ways of social organizing based on exchange, threat, or integry, and (3) they become more open to alternative social hierarchies to regain social order. Human beings attribute motives in the choice to cooperate or challenge social hierarchy. Brown draws upon economist Kenneth Boulding's ideas about social organizers to suggest motives that human beings attribute to relationships—exchange, threat, and integry. For example, human beings cooperate because they expect something in return (exchange). They cooperate because they expect a negative outcome if they do not cooperate (threat). They cooperate because of an interpretation of shared human identity (integry).

Like attention interventions, power interventions occur in communication interactions. The RSI model suggests that to encourage a power shift, interveners communicatively create social disorder by foregrounding anomalies in the current social hierarchy template. They advocate alternative ways of social organizing as the means to regain social order. To prevent a power shift and maintain the current social hierarchy, interveners communicatively foreground anomalies in the proposed template. They advocate ways to account for the anomalies in the current template. They attempt to dissuade openness to alternative ways of social organizing. In both cases, Brown concludes that communication drives social system change and continuity.

Because social hierarchy is a symbolic abstraction, it will always be incomplete and imperfect. As human beings shift from one social hierarchy to another, the newly adopted hierarchy will one day appear non-needs meeting. Thus, in the model, a continuous cycle of power shifts occur from cooperation to competition and vice versa in the symbolic creation of power. In the Power article, Brown traces social hierarchy shifts in black/white relationships from the 1910s to the 1970s through the lens of the RSI model. He also examines the power intervention strategies, tactics, and maneuvers of New York urban planner Robert Moses to demonstrate RSI model concepts.

The RSI model predicts that shifts in the symbolic categorization of power also result in need and attention shifts. Attention shifts occur as human beings pay attention to different aspects of experience to promote or prevent power shifts. Need interventions occur as shifts in power result in changes in interpretations of needs. As with the attention subsystem, the model views the power subsystem as one entry point for analyzing and intervening in social system change. Alternatively, social system change can be examined from the perspective of the need subsystem.

== Need interventions ==
The Ideology article refers to the need subsystem as "intrapersonal categorizing." Two later articles call the subsystem "need." In the RSI model, human beings have an innate need for a sense of order in self—to know who they are, their role in society, and who and what around them is important and meaningful. Social systems construct ideology to satisfy that need, just as the constructed ideology shapes how social system participants interpret their needs. Need interventions occur when human beings attempt to account for anomalies in their symbolically constructed interpretations of needs.

More specifically, the RSI model holds that human beings have two types of needs: biosocial and symbolic. Biosocial needs are innate needs, necessary for growth and survival, which are expressed in communication (e.g., when a person says, "I need water" to fulfill a biological need for water). Symbolic needs are those constituted by communication (e.g., when a person says, "I need Brand X water" because advertisers have persuaded the person to interpret Brand X as better meeting the need for health than tap water). In both cases, human beings create interdependencies with others to fulfill biosocial and symbolic needs. They learn from language tutors the social system's assumptions about what needs are important and how needs should be communicated and satisfied.

Brown draws upon social anthropologist Edmund Leach's idea of code-switching to explain how human beings create needs symbolically. Leach writes that human beings talk and act as if non-sensed or abstract concepts exist in the physical world (e.g., marriage, prosperity, recession), having "forgotten" that they symbolically constructed these concepts. They code switch, or act as if the non-sensed is now the sensed.

Need interventions involve cycles of increased and decreased communication to anomalies in symbolic constructions of needs. Brown theorizes that need interventions involve cycles that alternate between attributing and denying individual- and group-oriented needs. In the cycle, (1) human beings communicatively increase awareness or attention to unmet or attributed/denied needs, (2) they increase advocacy behavior toward those perceived as being able to meet the need, and (3) they become more open to those who can respond to attributed or denied need.

The model predicts that once a particular need has been fulfilled, then attention to that particular need decreases, advocacy behavior decreases, and openness to others decreases. At the same time, attention to "new" needs increases. In addition, if a need goes unmet and the human beings advocating the need continually encounter non-needs meeting responses, they might begin advocating the need in ways that the social system names as inappropriate (e.g., shifting from protests to setting buildings on fire). Alternatively, the needs advocates might rename the need in a way that diminishes its urgency and shift attention to other needs.

According to the model, to promote a shift in needs, an intervener communicatively increases attention to how current needs are not being met or how needs expectancies are unfulfilled. Then the intervener advocates an alternative interpretation of needs and shows how it makes better sense of experience in the attempt to increase others' openness to this needs proposal. To prevent a shift in needs, an intervener foregrounds anomalies in the proposed interpretation of needs. Then the intervener advocates a way to account for anomalies in the currently existing interpretation of needs to attempt to maintain the current interpretation of needs. In both cases, communication drives social system change and continuity.

Because the RSI model is systemic, the need subsystem is assumed to be interconnected with the power and attention subsystems. Thus, as interpretations of needs change, so do interpretations of power relationships within the social system. In addition, attention shifts occur when the social system emphasizes different types of needs (individual or group)

== Social system interventions ==
Although Brown presents the RSI model as three subsystems, he theorizes that social system intervention is an holistic process that involves all three subsystems simultaneously. He explains that human beings' linear language limits their ability to talk about all three subsystems concurrently. Thus, when analyzing or enacting interventions, human beings tend to emphasize one subsystem and background the other two. The RSI model treats the shifts in the backgrounded subsystems as "side effects" of the primary subsystem intervention.

In addition, in the RSI model, all social system interventions involve multiple interveners. Brown notes, though, that the linear nature of language often results in human beings acting as if one person or group is the primary intervener. The RSI model suggests that all social system change attempts are influenced simultaneously by interveners communicating to promote change and interveners communicating to impede change.

Brown names his model "social intervention" to emphasize his conclusion that any attempt to encourage or discourage social system change is an intervention, not control or manipulation. He argues that the interconnected nature of the subsystems and the communication actions of multiple interveners mean that the outcome of any attempted system change evidences multi-causation. Thus, Brown views social intervention as a communication act that attempts to "nudge" a social system toward or away from a particular way of naming worldview, power, and needs.

Overall, the RSI model is conceived of as a framework for analyzing and tracking the communication patterns that generate social system change and continuity. It also can be viewed as a methodology to guide efforts to promote and/or prevent social system change.
