= TableTopics =

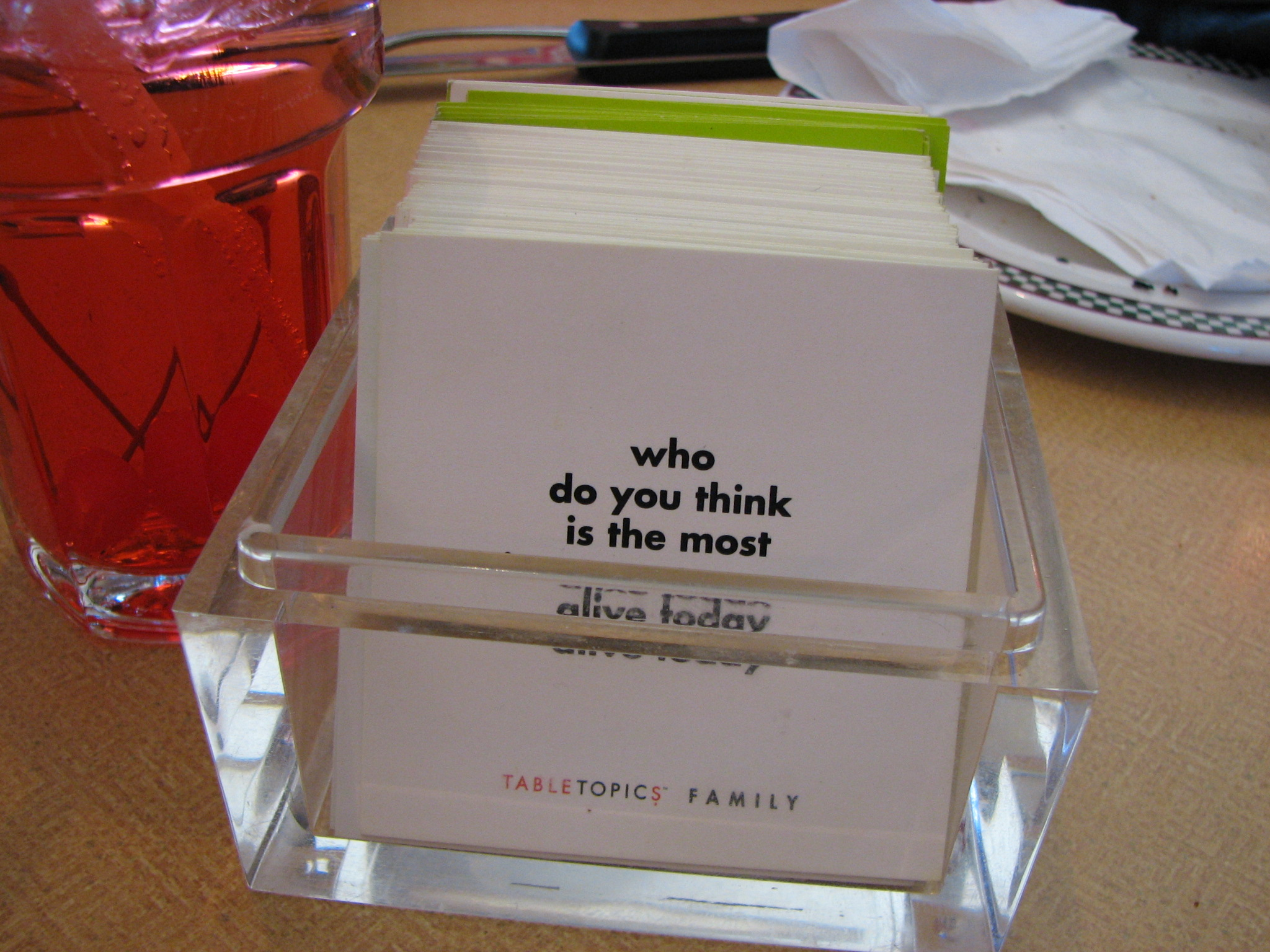
TableTopics

TableTopics is a conversation and icebreaker game that features a series of questions written on a stack of cards enclosed in a cube box. The game was created in 2002 by Cristy Clarke, and comes in 20 different varieties. An app version of the game has also been created. It has been featured in Oprah Magazine and USA Today.
