= Association of Speakers Clubs =

Organization

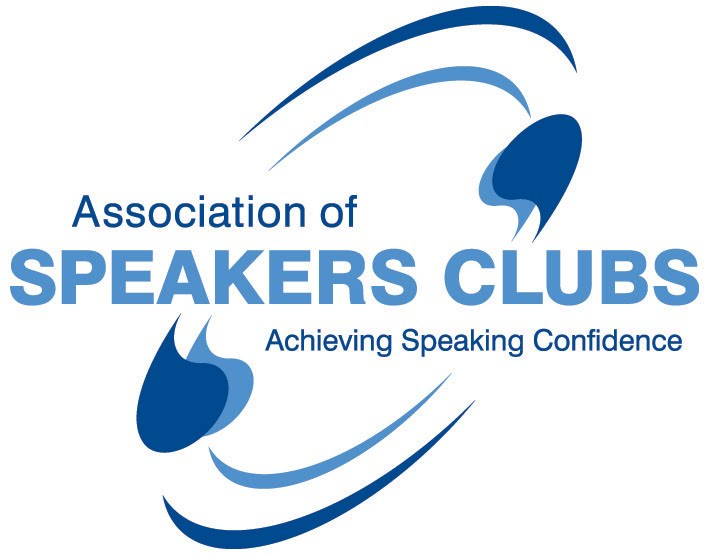
- Abbreviation: ASC
- Legal status: Non-profit organization
- Purpose: Educational
- Members: over 1000 members; over 100 clubs

The Association of Speakers Clubs (ASC) is a British confederation of about 150 clubs around the country that promote the skill of public speaking.

== History ==
The ASC was formed by de-merger from Toastmasters International (TI) in 1973. Most of the TI clubs in Scotland and northern and central England joined the ASC.
