= Public speaking =

Performing a speech to a live audience

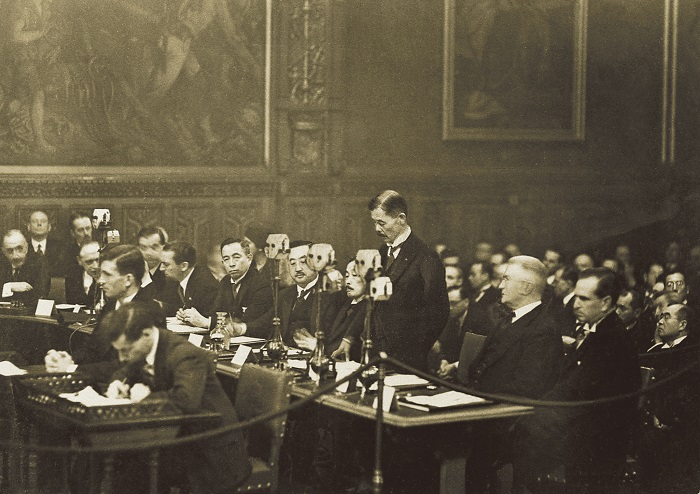
Wakatsuki Reijirō speaking at the London Naval Conference in 1930

Public speaking, or oratory, is the delivery of a speech (sometimes called an oration) to a live audience. Throughout history, public speaking has held significant cultural, religious, and political importance, emphasizing the necessity of effective rhetorical skills. It allows individuals to connect with a group of people to discuss any topic. The goal of a public speaker may be to educate, teach, or influence an audience. Public speakers often utilize visuals such as slideshows, images, and short videos to enhance audience understanding.

The ancient Chinese philosopher Confucius, a key figure in the study of public speaking, advocated for speeches that could profoundly affect individuals, including those not present in the audience. In the Western tradition, public speaking was extensively studied in Ancient Greece and Ancient Rome, where it was a fundamental component of rhetoric and analyzed by prominent thinkers.

Aristotle, the ancient Greek philosopher, identified three types of speeches: deliberative (political), forensic (judicial), and epideictic (ceremonial or demonstrative). Similarly, the Roman philosopher and orator Cicero categorized public speaking into three purposes: judicial (courtroom), deliberative (political), and demonstrative (ceremonial), closely aligning with Aristotle's classifications.

In modern times, public speaking remains a highly valued skill in various sectors, including government, industry, and advocacy. It has also evolved with the advent of digital technologies, incorporating video conferencing, multimedia presentations, and other innovative forms of communication.

== Purposes ==
The main objective of public speaking is to inform or change the audience's thoughts and actions. The function of public speaking is determined by the speaker's intent, but it is possible for the same speaker, with the same intent, to deliver substantially different speeches to different audiences.

Public speaking is frequently directed at a select and sometimes restricted audience, consisting of individuals who may hold different perspectives. This audience can encompass enthusiastic supporters of the speaker, reluctant attendees with opposing views, or strangers with varying levels of interest in the speaker's topic. Proficient speakers recognize that even a modest-sized audience is not a uniform entity but rather a diverse assembly of individuals.

Public speaking aims to either reassure an anxious audience or alert a complacent audience to something important. Once the speaker has determined which of these approaches is required, they will use a combination of storytelling and informational approaches to achieve their goals.

The purposes of speech can vary depending on the targeted audience. Speeches during ceremonies may incorporate humor or stories from moments in the life of the person being celebrated. Speeches focusing on politics often use persuasion to encourage listeners to take a course of action, while forensic speeches involve debates in which participants take sides, defend certain beliefs, and are judged on how well they support their arguments.

=== Persuasion ===
Persuasion is a term that is derived from the Latin word "persuadere." Persuasive speaking aims to change the audience's beliefs and is commonly used in political debates. Leaders use such public forums in an attempt to persuade their audience, whether they be the general public or government officials.

Persuasive speaking involves four essential elements: (i) the speaker or persuader; (ii) the audience; (iii) the speaking method; and (iv) the message the speaker is trying to convey. When attempting to persuade an audience to change their opinions, a speaker appeals to their emotions and beliefs.

Various techniques exist for speakers to gain audience support. Speakers can demand action from the audience, use inclusive language like 'we' and 'us' to create unity between the speaker and the audience, and choose words with strong connotations to intensify a message's impact. Rhetorical questions, anecdotes, generalizations, exaggerations, metaphors, and irony may be employed to increase the likelihood of persuading an audience.

Though historically uncommon, speakers today are enabled to utilise statistics, data as well as other sources of information, such as the internet, in order to strengthen their argument, stance or proposal; This has only evolved during the modern era, having been generally unavailable at the current rate in the years beforehand with the exception of media via newspapers, television, although claims given by speakers have often been subject to inaccurate information provided by the aforementioned, often in direct correlation with the big lie means of oratory. This has been further intensified through the recent evolution of mass media in most nations.

=== Education ===
Public speaking can often take an educational form, where the speaker transfers knowledge to an audience. TED Talks are an example of educational public speaking. The speakers inform their audience about different topics, such as science, technology, religion, economics, human society, and psychology. TED speakers can use the platform to share personal experiences with traumatic events, such as abuse, bullying, grief, assault, suicidal ideation, near-death encounters, and mental illness. They may attempt to raise awareness and acceptance of stigmatizing issues, such as disabilities, racial differences, LGBTQ rights, children's rights, and women's rights.

TED Conferences, LLC, is a media organization that posts talks online for free distribution under the slogan: "ideas worth spreading". TED was originally built by Richard Saul Furman in February 1984 as a conference and has been held annually since 1990. Talks delivered in these conferences are usually posted online. The videos of these recorded speeches and talks inspire native and non-native speakers of English to learn the language and presentation style that is used. As such, TED Talk videos can help improve speaking skills and vocabulary retention.

Numerous studies have highlighted the benefits of teaching public speaking strategies in academic settings, including increased self-confidence, and improved access to information. Harvard University offers a range of courses in public speaking, including persuasive communication and personal narratives. With the continued popularity of academic conferences and TED talks taking place worldwide, public speaking has become an essential subject in academia for scholarly and professional advancement. Additionally, work meetings and presentations require proficiency in public speaking to actively formulate ideas and solutions, and modern technology helps companies release information to a wider audience.

=== Intervention ===
The intervention style of speaking is a relatively new method proposed by rhetorical theorist William R. Brown. This style revolves around the theory of idealism, which holds that humans create a symbolic meaning for life and the things around them. Due to this, the symbolic meaning of everything changes based on the way one communicates. When approaching communication with an intervention style, communication is understood to be responsible for the constant changes in society, behaviors, and how one considers the meaning behind objects, ideologies, and everyday life.

From an interventional perspective, when individuals communicate, they are intervening with what is already a reality and might "shift symbolic reality." This approach to communication encompasses the possibility or idea that one may be responsible for unexpected outcomes due to what and how one communicates.

This perspective widens the scope of focus from a single speaker who is intervening to a multitude of speakers all communicating and intervening, simultaneously affecting the world around us.

== History ==
=== India ===
The Vedas and the Upanishads show usage of diction, intonation and music in effective ways. The epics of Ramayana and Mahabharata also show persuassion. The Bhagavad Gita also serves as an example of deliberative rhetoric.

=== China ===
In Ancient China, the use of rhetoric was delayed, largely because the country then lacked rhetoricians who could train students. It was understood that Chinese rhetoric was part of Chinese philosophy, which schools taught focusing on two concepts: "Wen" (rhetoric); and "Zhi" (thoughtful content). Ancient Chinese rhetoric shows strong connections with modern public speaking, as Chinese rhetoric placed a high value on ethics.

Ancient Chinese rhetoric had three objectives: (i) using language to reflect people's feelings; (ii) using language to be more pointed, effective, and impactful; and (iii) using rhetoric as an "aesthetic tool." Chinese rhetoric traditionally focused more on the written than the spoken word, but both share similar characteristics of construction.

A unique and key difference between Chinese and Western rhetoric is the audience targeted for persuasion. In Chinese rhetoric, state rulers were the audience, whereas Western rhetoric targets the public. Another difference between Chinese and Western rhetoric practices is how a speaker establishes credibility or Ethos. In Chinese rhetoric, the speaker does not focus on individual credibility, like Western rhetoric. Instead, the speaker focuses on collectivism by sharing personal experiences and establishing a connection between the speaker's concern and the audience's interest.

Chinese employs three standards in assessing public rhetoric:

- Tracing: This standard evaluates how well the speaker is doing compared to traditional speaking practices.
- Examination: This standard evaluates how well the speaker considers the audience's daily lives.
- Practice: This standard evaluates how relevant the topic or argument is to the "state, society, and people."

=== Greece ===
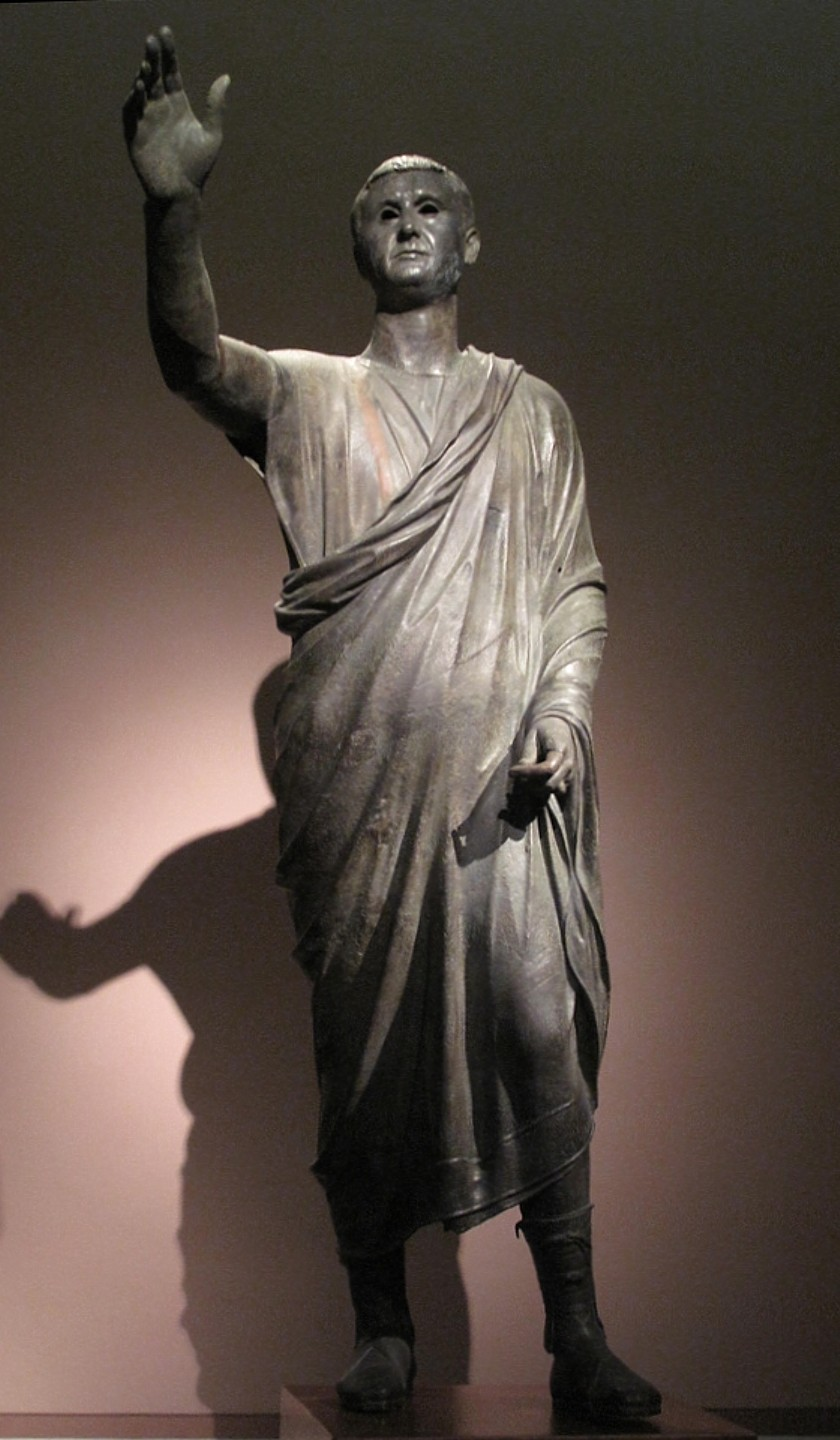
The Orator, a c. 100 BCE Etrusco-Roman bronze sculpture depicting Aule Metele, an Etruscan man wearing a Roman toga while engaged in rhetoric. The statue features an inscription in the Etruscan alphabet.

Although evidence of public speaking training exists in ancient Egypt, the first known writing on oratory is 2,000 years old from ancient Greece. This work elaborates on principles drawn from the practices and experiences of ancient Greek orators.

Aristotle, one of the first oratory teachers to use definitive rules and models, believed that successful speakers combined, to varying degrees, three qualities in their speech: reasoning, which he called Logos; credentials, which he called Ethos; and emotion, which he called Pathos. Aristotle's work became an essential part of a liberal arts education during the Middle Ages and the Renaissance. The classical antiquity works by the ancient Greeks capture how they taught and developed the art of public speaking thousands of years ago.

In classical Greece and Rome, rhetoric was the main component of composition and speech delivery, both critical skills for use in public and private life. In ancient Greece, citizens spoke for themselves rather than having professionals, such as modern lawyers, speak for them. Any citizen who wished to succeed in court, politics, or social life had to learn public speaking techniques. Rhetorical tools were first taught by a group of teachers called Sophists, who taught paying students how to speak effectively using their methods.

Separately from the Sophists, Socrates, Plato, and Aristotle developed their theories of public speaking, teaching these principles to students interested in learning rhetorical skills. Plato founded The Academy and Aristotle founded The Lyceum to teach these skills.

Demosthenes was a well-known orator from Athens. After his father died when he was 7, he had three legal guardians: Aphobus, Demophon, and Theryppides. His inspiration for public speaking came from learning that his guardians had robbed him of the money his father left for his education. His first public speech was in the court proceeding he brought against his three guardians. After that, Demosthenes continued to practice public speaking. He is known for sticking pebbles into his mouth to improve his pronunciation, talking while running so that he would not lose his breath, and practicing speaking in front of a mirror to improve his delivery.

When Philip II, the ruler of Macedon, tried to conquer the Greeks, Demosthenes made a speech called Kata Philippou A. In this speech, he spoke about why he opposed Philip II as a threat to all of Greece. This was the first of several speeches known as the Philippics. He made other speeches known as the Olynthiacs. Both series of speeches favored independence and rallied Athenians against Philip II.

=== Rome ===
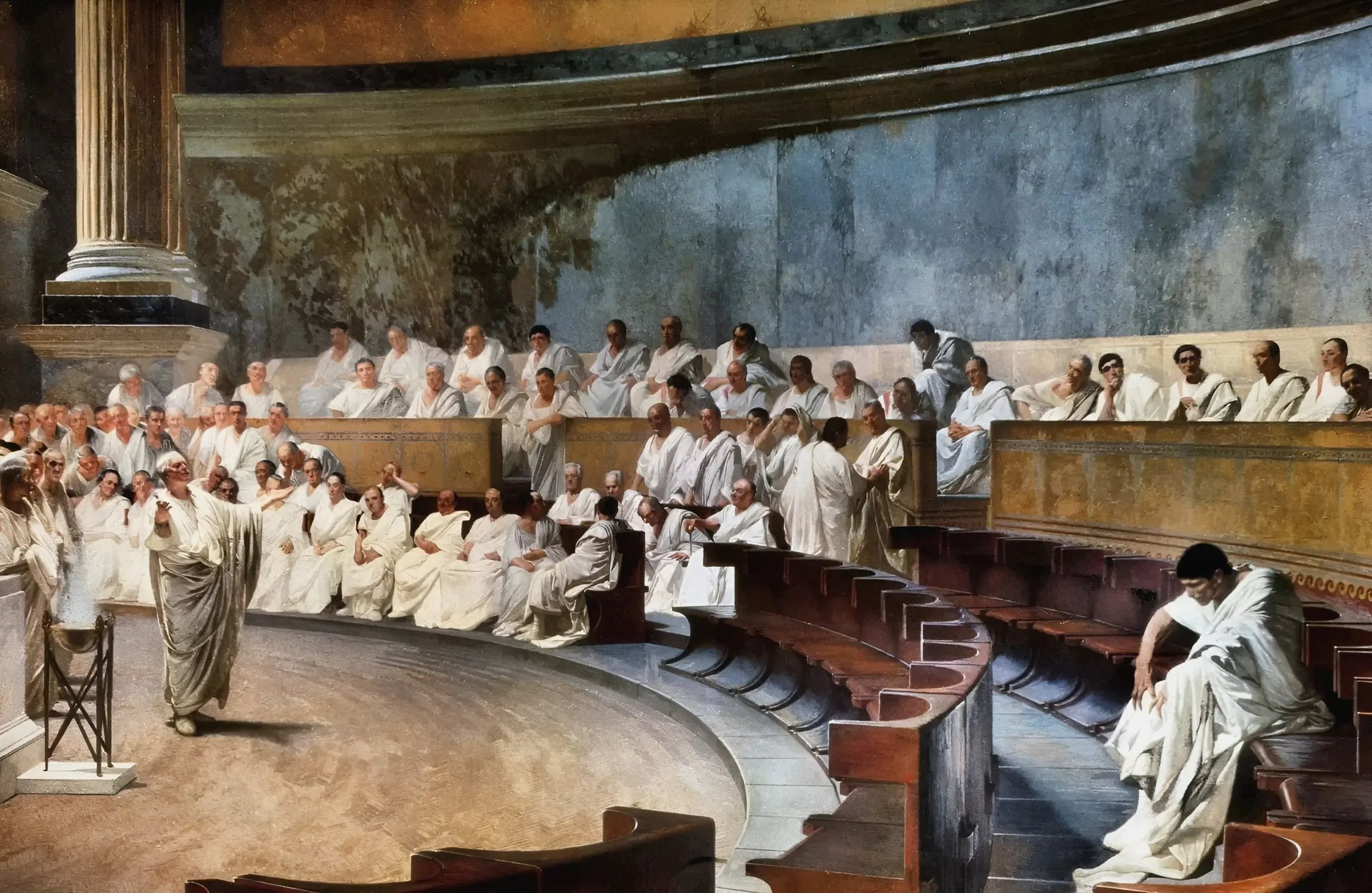
A portrait of Cicero, an orator during the Roman Empire, addressing the Roman Senate, depicted in Cicero Denounces Catiline, an 1889 fresco by Cesare Maccari

During the political rise of the Roman Republic, Roman orators copied and modified the ancient Greek techniques of public speaking. Instruction in rhetoric developed into a full curriculum, including instruction in grammar (study of the poets), preliminary exercises (progymnasmata), and preparation of public speeches (declamation) in both forensic and deliberative genres.

In Latin, rhetoric was heavily influenced by Cicero, an orator during the Roman Empire, and emphasized a broad education in all areas of the humanities. Other areas of rhetorical study included the use of wit and humor, the appeal to the listener's emotions, and the use of digressions. Oratory in the Roman Empire, though less central to political life than during the Republic, remained important in law and entertainment. Famous orators were celebrities in ancient Rome, becoming wealthy and prominent in society.

The ornate Latin style was the primary form of oration through the mid-20th century. After World War II and the increased use of film and television, the Latin oration style began to fall out of favor. This cultural change likely had to do with the rise of the scientific method and the emphasis on a "plain" style of speaking and writing. Even today's formal oratory is much less ornate than in the Classical Era.

== Theorists ==
=== Aristotle's "Rhetoric" ===
Aristotle

In one of his most famed writings, "Rhetoric", written in 350 BCE, Aristotle described mastering the art of public speaking. In this and other works by Aristotle, rhetoric is the act of publicly persuading an audience. Rhetoric is similar to dialect: he defines both as being acts of persuasion. However, dialect is the act of persuading someone in private, whereas rhetoric is about persuading people in a public setting. Aristotle defines someone who practices rhetoric or a "rhetorician" as an individual who can comprehend persuasion and how it is applied.

Aristotle divides rhetoric into three elements: (i) the speaker; (ii) the topic or point of the speech; and (iii) the audience. Aristotle also classifies oration into three types: (i) political, used to convince people to take or not take action; (ii) forensic, usually used in law related to accusing or defending someone; and (iii) ceremonial, which recognizes someone positively or negatively.

Aristotle breaks down the political category into five focuses or themes: "ways and means, war and peace, national defense, imports and exports, and legislation." These focuses are broken down into detail so that the speaker can effectively influence an audience to agree and support the speaker's ideas.

- The focus of "ways and means" deals with economic aspects of how the country is spending money.
- "Peace and War" focuses on what the country has to offer in terms of military power, how war has been conducted, how war has affected the country in the past, and how other countries have conducted war.
- "National defense" deals with considering a country's position and strength in the event of an invasion. Fortifying structures and points with a strategic advantage should all be considered.
- "Food supply" is concerned with the ability to support a country in regards to food, importing and exporting food, and carefully making decisions to arrange agreements with other countries.
- "Legislation" is the most important to Aristotle. The legislation of a country is the most crucial aspect because everything is affected by the policies and laws set by the people in power.

In Aristotle's "Rhetoric" writing, he mentions three strategies someone can use to try to persuade an audience: Establishing the character of a speaker (Ethos), influencing the emotional element of the audience (Pathos), and focusing on the argument specifically (Logos). Aristotle believes establishing the character of a speaker is effective in persuasion because the audience will believe what the speaker is saying to be true if the speaker is credible and trustworthy. With the audience's emotional state, Aristotle believes that individuals do not make the same decisions when in different moods. Because of this, one needs to try to influence the audience by being in control of one's emotions, making persuasion effective. The argument itself can affect the attempt to persuade by making the argument of the case so clear and valid that the audience will understand and believe that the speaker's point is real.

In the last part of "Rhetoric", Aristotle mentions that the most critical piece of persuasion is to know in detail what makes up government and to attack what makes it unique: "customs, institutions, and interest". Aristotle also states that everyone is persuaded by considering people's interests and how the society in which they live influences their interests.

=== Cicero's Five Canons of Rhetoric ===
In his writing De Inventione, Cicero explained the five canons or tenets of rhetoric. The five canons apply to rhetoric and public speaking. The five canons are invention, arrangement, style, memory, and delivery.

Invention is the process of coming up with what to say to persuade the audience of the key points. Individuals will need to understand their topic, brainstorm their ideas, and discover effective research strategies that they can use to get their point across. Arrangement is the process of structuring ideas together. Cicero and the Roman rhetorician Quintilian identified the structure of a text as Exordium, Narrative, Partition, Confirmation, Refutation, and Peroration (or conclusion). In modern writing and speaking, this structure is often simplified to an introduction, body, and conclusion. Style is the process of choosing language and constructing your presentation to create an emotional response from the audience. Individuals can achieve this by using language and rhetoric devices like analogy, allusion and alliteration.

Memory is remembering enough so that individuals are able to fully and fluently present without reading off a paper or note cards. This includes figures of speech, which can be used to improve memory. Roman rhetoricians made a distinction between natural memory (an innate ability) and artificial memory (particular techniques that enhanced natural abilities). Delivery is the last of the five canons of rhetoric and involves using techniques that help communicate a message effectively. These may include tone of voice, changes in pace, pauses, volume, body language, positioning, and props.

== Glossophobia ==
The fear of speaking in public, known as glossophobia or public speaking anxiety, is often mentioned as one of the most common phobias. The reason is uncertain, but it has been speculated that this fear is primal, similar to how animals fear being seen by predators.

The apprehension experienced when speaking in public can have several causes, such as social anxiety disorder, or a prior experience of public humiliation. This can be related to stage fright.

== Training ==
Effective public speaking can be developed by joining a club such as Rostrum, Toastmasters International, Association of Speakers Clubs (ASC), or Speaking Circles, in which members are assigned exercises to improve their speaking skills. Members learn by observation and practice and hone their skills by listening to constructive suggestions, followed by new public speaking exercises.

Tips for improving public speaking:

1. Rehearse
2. Craft speech that targets audience.
3. Organize it in a way that attracts audience attention.
4. Adapt to audiences' reaction.
5. Make your speech interesting through use of language.
6. Use tone and body language.
7. Refrain from script and make an outline
8. Refrain from making gestures that distract audience.
9. Make your intro interesting and leave audience with something to think about at ending.
10. Use audiovisual aids that enhance or clarify your speech.

=== Toastmasters International ===
Toastmasters International is a public speaking organization with over 15,000 clubs worldwide and more than 300,000 members. This organization helps individuals with their public speaking skills, as well as leadership skills necessary to become effective public speakers such as content development, club development, and speech contests. Members of the club meet and work together on their skills; each member practices giving speeches, while the other members evaluate and provide feedback. A typical meeting also includes Table Topics, which refers to impromptu speaking, that is, talking about different topics without having anything planned. Members can volunteer to serve as a meeting functionary to help facilitate the meeting using their public speaking and leadership skills. The functionary roles enable each member the opportunity to speak at least one time at the meetings. Members can participate in a variety of speech contests, in which the winners can compete in the annual World Championship of Public Speaking.

=== Australian Rostrum ===
Rostrum is another public speaking organization, founded in Australia, with more than 100 clubs all over the country. This organization aims at helping people become better communicators, no matter the occasion. At the meetings, speakers can gain skills by presenting speeches, while members provide feedback to those presenting. Qualified speaking trainers attend these meetings as well, and provide professional feedback at the end of the meetings. There are competitions that are held for members to participate in. An online club is also available for members, no matter where they live.

=== Self-training solutions ===
The new millennium has seen a notable increase in the number of training solutions offered in the form of video and online courses. Videos can provide simulated examples of behaviors to emulate. Professional public speakers often engage in ongoing training and education to refine their craft. This may include seeking guidance to improve their speaking skills, such as learning better storytelling techniques, learning how to use humor effectively as a communication tool, and continuously researching their topic area of focus. They also recognize that content is king and advocate writing as a self-training exercise because it requires a speaker to focus on developing the content, not just speaking techniques.

== Professional speakers ==
Public speaking for business and commercial events is often done by professionals, whose expertise is well established. These speakers can be contracted independently, through representation by a speakers bureau, or by other means. Public speaking plays a large role in the professional world. It is believed that 70 percent of all jobs involve some form of public speaking. Most professional roles require some sort of public speaking skills. Individuals will often be expected to perform tasks like training staff, leading meetings, and pitching proposals.

== Modern ==
=== Technology ===
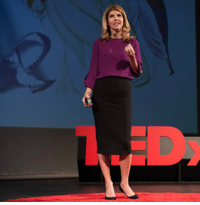
A TED Talk

New technology has opened different forms of public speaking that are non-traditional such as TED Talks, which are conferences that are broadcast globally. This form of public speaking has created a wider audience base because public speaking can now reach both physical and virtual audiences. These audiences can be watching from all around the world. YouTube is another platform that allows public speaking to reach a larger audience. On YouTube, people can post videos of themselves. Audiences can watch these videos for all types of purposes.

Multimedia presentations can contain different video clips, sound effects, animation, laser pointers, remote control clickers, and bullet points.

Public speakers may use audience response systems. For large assemblies, the speaker will usually speak with the aid of a public address system or microphone and loudspeaker.

=== Telecommunication ===
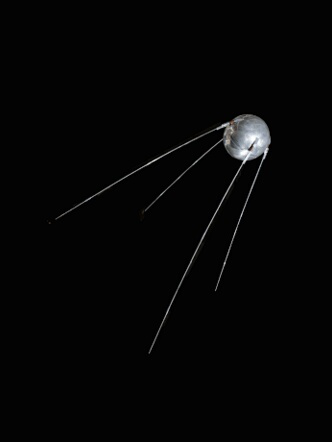
Sputnik 1, launched by the Soviet Union on October 4, 1957, invoked the Space Race with the U.S., which furthered innovation and technology, especially in communication.

Telecommunication and videoconferencing are also forms of public speaking. David M. Fetterman of Stanford University wrote in his 1997 article Videoconferencing over the Internet: "Videoconferencing technology allows geographically disparate parties to hear and see each other usually through satellite or telephone communication systems." This technology is helpful for large conference meetings and face-to-face communication between parties without demanding the inconvenience of travel.

=== Notable modern theorists ===
- Harold Lasswell developed Lasswell's model of communication. Five basic elements of public speaking are described in this theory: the communicator, message, medium, audience, and effect. In short, the speaker should be answering the question "who says what in which channel to whom with what effect?"
- Several other models and theories were created in the 1950s, 60s and 70s. These tend to include emphasis on feedback from listeners, as well as understandings of context, shared knowledge and shared experience between people, and communication noise.

== Women and public speaking ==
=== Australia ===
An organization called the Penguin Club of Australia was founded in Sydney in 1937 and aimed at developing women's communication skills. Led by Jean Ellis, the organization spread to other territories of Australia and current-day Papua New Guinea over time. A main premise of the organization was that it was created "for women by women." They renamed to "Speaking Made Easy" in 2020.

=== Great Britain ===
The British political activist, Emmeline Pankhurst, founded the Women's Social and Political Union (WSPU) on October 10, 1903. The organization was aimed towards fighting for women's right to a parliamentary vote, which only men were granted at the time. Emmeline was known for being a powerful orator, who led many women to rebel through militant forms until the outbreak of World War I in 1914.

=== Japan ===
Kishida Toshiko (1861–1901) was a female speaker during the Meiji era in Japan. In October 1883, she publicly delivered a speech entitled 'Hakoiri Musume' (Daughters Kept in Boxes) in front of approximately 600 people. Presented in Yotsu no Miya Theater in Kyoto, she criticized the action of parents that shelter their daughters from the outside world. Despite her prompt arrest, Kishida demonstrated the ability of Japanese women to evoke women's issues, experiences, and liberation in public spaces, through the use of public speaking.

=== Pakistan ===
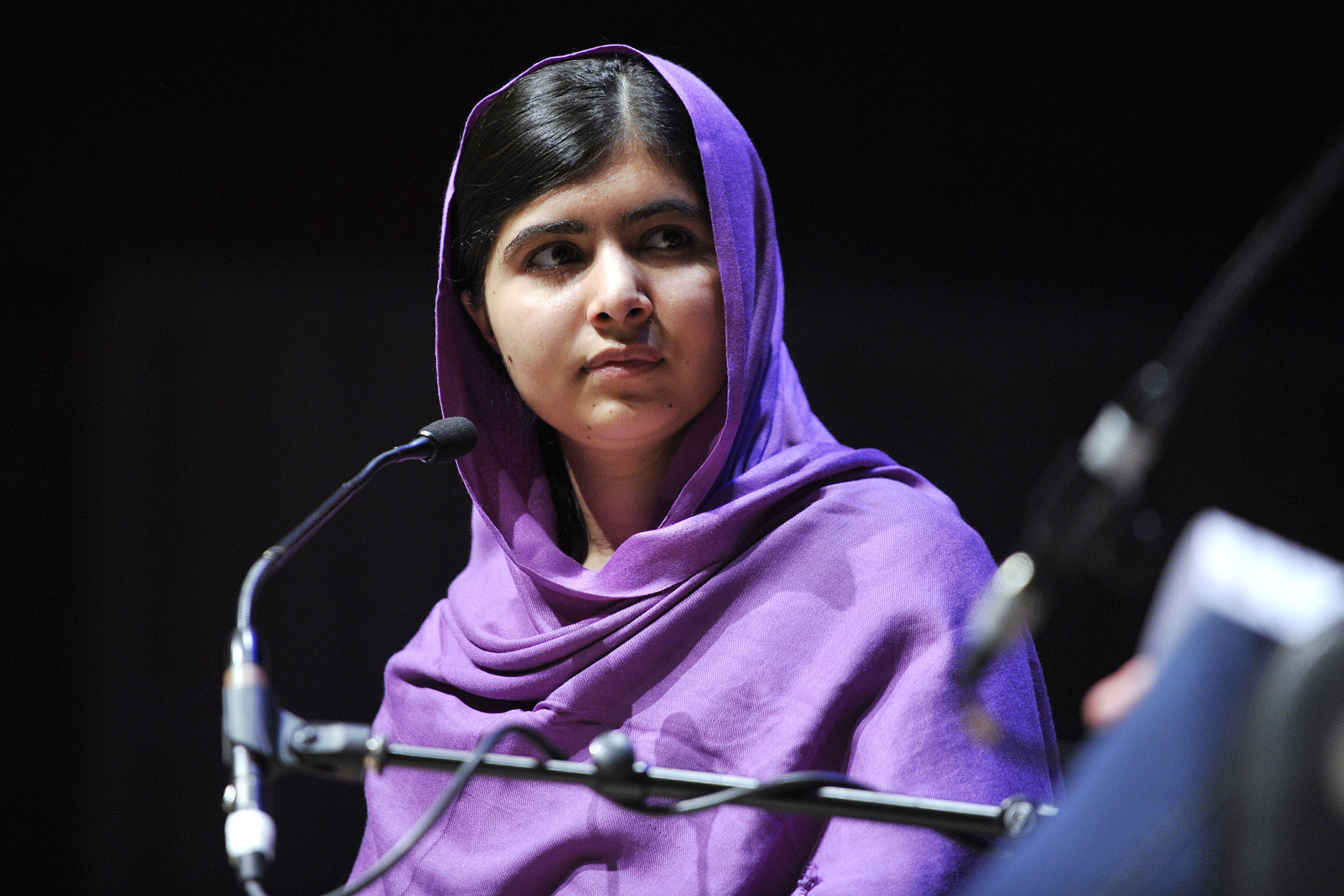
Malala Yousafzai, an educational activist from Pakistan, speaking

Malala Yousafzai, a public speaker born in the Swat Valley in Pakistan, is an educational activist for women and girls. After the Taliban restricted the educational rights of women in the Swat Valley, Yousafzai presented her first speech, How Dare the Taliban Take Away My Basic Right to Education?, in which she protested the shutdowns of the schools. She presented this speech to the press in Peshawar, bringing more awareness to the situation in Pakistan. She is known for her "inspiring and passionate speech" about educational rights given at the United Nations. She is the youngest person ever to receive the Nobel Peace Prize, at the age of 17, which was awarded to her in 2014. Her public speaking has brought worldwide attention to the difficulties of young girls in Pakistan. She continues to advocate for educational rights for women and girls worldwide through the Malala Fund, to help girls around the world receive 12 years of education.

=== United States ===
During the 18th and 19th centuries in the United States, a prohibition was instituted whereby women were precluded from engaging in public discourse within the confines of the courtroom, the Senate floor, and the pulpit. It was deemed improper for a woman to be heard in a public setting. Exceptions existed for women from the Quaker religion, allowing them to speak publicly in meetings of the church.

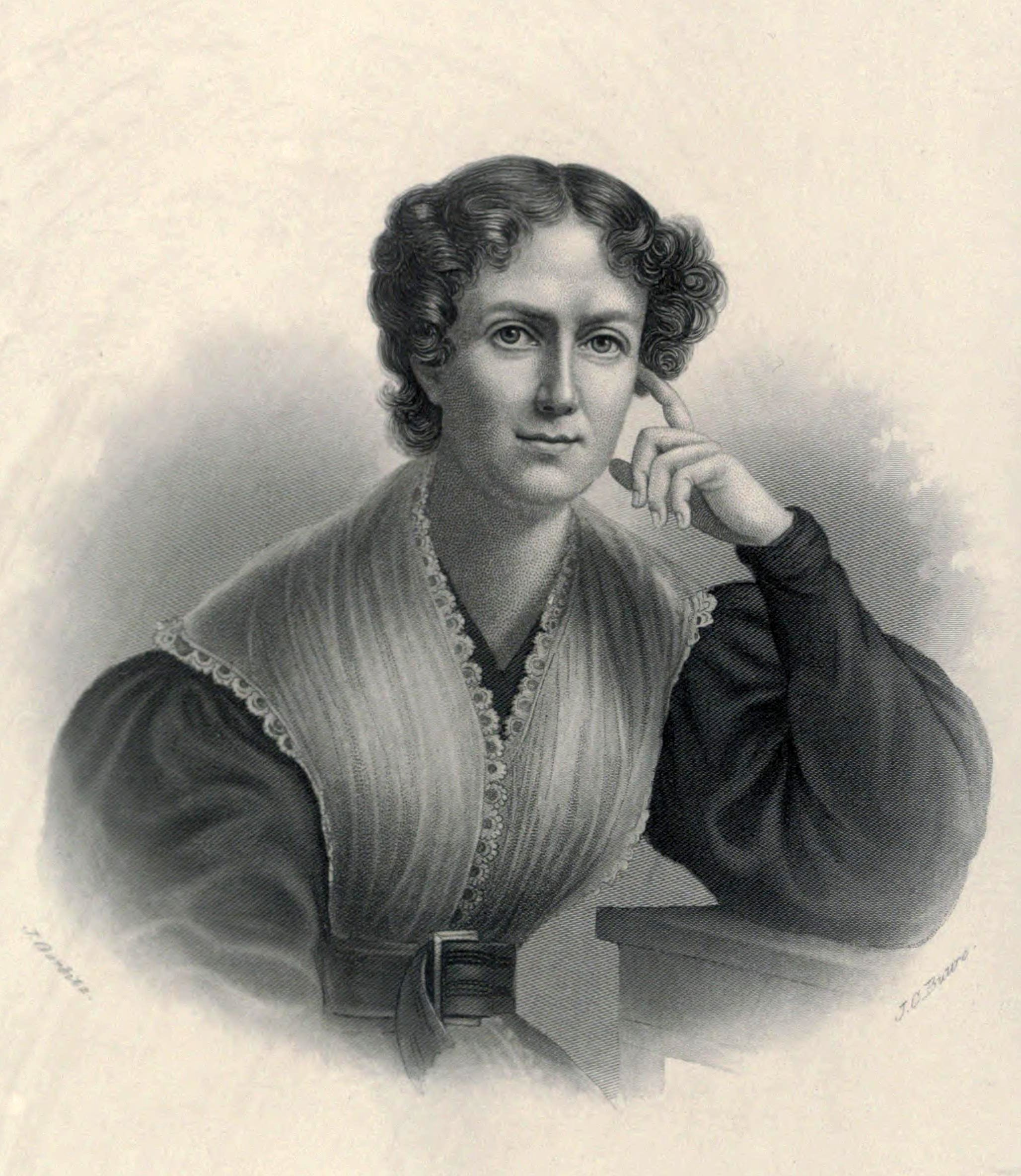
Frances Wright was an abolitionist, feminist, freethinker, and social reformer who advocated for many injustices.

Frances Wright was one of the first female public speakers in the United States, advocating equal education for both women and men through large audiences and the press. Maria Stewart, a woman of African American descent, was also one of the first female speakers of the United States, lecturing in Boston in front of both men and women just four years after Wright, in 1832 and 1833, on educational opportunities and abolition for young girls.

The first female agents and sisters of the American Anti-Slavery Society Angelina Grimké and Sarah Grimké created a platform for public lectures to women and conducted tours between 1837 and 1839. The sisters advocated that slavery relates to women's rights and that women need equality. They came to a disagreement with churches that did not want the two speaking publicly due to them being women.

== See also ==
- Audience response
- Declamation
- Debate
- Eloquence
- Eulogy
- Lecture
- List of speeches
- Public orator
- Speechwriter
- Speakers' bureau
