= Speakers bureau =

Collection of speakers who talk about a particular subject

A speakers bureau is a collection of speakers who talk about a particular subject, or a company, which operates to facilitate speakers for clients requiring motivational speakers, celebrity appearances, conference facilitators, or keynote speakers.

A speakers bureau will hold a database of personalities from diverse fields such as politics, sports, business, television, education, and comedy. The speaker bureau team initiates the introduction between speaker and client and supports both parties from the primary stages of making contact throughout the booking and logistics process. Clients requiring speakers are usually businesses, corporations, charities, educational or public institutions. A speakers bureau helps client and speaker negotiate a speaking fee, a payment awarded to an individual for speaking at a public event. This fee is usually set by the speaker or the speaker’s agent. Logistics can be dealt with by the speakers bureau, like fees, transport, accommodation and timing, or communication between speaker and client.

Speakers bureaus come in various forms and traditionally charge a commission of the speaking fee for their services. However, with the rise of the Internet, alternative business models have found a place. Few online platforms allow an organization and speaker to connect with each other directly and without the need of an agency. Traditional speakers bureaus are able to provide a more hands on experience for the client and handle contracts, negotiations, and other issues that may arise in the booking process.

== Types of speakers ==
A motivational speaker or keynote speaker is a professional speaker who speaks publicly with the intention of inspiring and motivating a relevant audience. In a business context, they are employed to clearly communicate company strategy and assist employees to see the future in a positive light and inspire workers to come together as a team. They can also be speakers who advance diversity, equity, and inclusion by providing insights and trainings about culture, history, and social justice.

== Sources ==
- Lilly Walters (1999). "Speaking Industry Trends 2000: A Report on Professional Speakers, Speakers Bureaus and Meeting Planners". Royal Publishing. ISBN 0934344507.
