= Toastmasters International =

Nonprofit organization promoting communication, public speaking and leadership

- Abbreviation: TI, TM
- Formation: October 22, 1924; 102 years ago
- Founder: Ralph C. Smedley
- Type: INGO
- Tax ID no.: 95-1300076
- Legal status: Non-profit organization
- Purpose: Educational
- Headquarters: 9127 South Jamaica Street, Meridian, Colorado, US
- Region served: Worldwide
- Members: 265,261 (2025)
- International President: Aletta Rochat (2025-2026)
- Revenue: $38,571,257 (2024)
- Staff: 198 (2016)
- Volunteers: 117,789 (2016)
- Website: toastmasters.org

Toastmasters International (TI) is a US-headquartered nonprofit educational organization that operates clubs worldwide to promote communication, public speaking, and leadership skills.

== History ==
On 24 March 1905, Dr. Ralph C. Smedley, educational director of the Bloomington YMCA in Illinois, organized a club to train young boys and men in public speaking skills. George Sutton, general secretary of the YMCA, named the club "a Toastmasters Club". Following a work transfer to Freeport, Illinois, formed another club there, but neither club continued after he was transferred elsewhere.

Toastmasters international grew out of a club founded by Smedley on October 22, 1924, at the YMCA in Santa Ana, California, United States. This club still exists, and is designated Club #1 in the organization. It originated as a set of classes intended to improve the communication skills of the young men under his charge. Toastmasters International was incorporated under Californian law on December 19, 1932.

The first international chapter was established in Vancouver, Canada, in 1932. The organization began admitting women in 1973.

In 1999, Toastmasters International (TI) had 170,000 members spanning 68 countries. By 2025, TI had 265,000 members across 149 countries and 13,833 clubs worldwide.

== Toastmasters club structure ==
Toastmasters International uses a local club-based structure, with an average club size of around 22 members. Meetings are held every week or bi-weekly and usually in the evening, although some clubs meet in the morning or afternoon. Each club operates as a separate entity with a set of requirements leading to chartered status for them to be recognised as official Toastmasters clubs. The chartered status allows clubs to use the names, promotional material and program of Toastmasters International.

Every meeting is based on a set of organized speeches. Speakers are given feedback, often by a more experienced member, who then gives an impromptu speech with constructive feedback based on their performance.

A portion of the meetings is devoted to Table Topics, impromptu speeches that are assigned on the spot by a Topicsmaster. Guests are invited to participate in the Table Topics segment of the club meeting or vote on the best speech.

== Education programs ==
Toastmasters International aims to build the public speaking and leadership skills.

=== Pathways ===
The Pathways education system consists of 6 differing paths suited to their needs and requirements, based around Public Speaking, Interpersonal Communication, Management, Strategic Leadership, and Confidence. The available pathways are ‘Dynamic Leadership, Engaging Humor, Motivational Strategies, Persuasive Influence, Presentation Mastery and Visionary Communication’. Every path is made up of at least 14 projects.

=== Speechcraft ===
Speechcraft is a 4- to 8-week program intended to develop leadership skills, focus on content development, and participate in speech contests.

== Public speaking championship ==
Toastmasters runs an international public speaking championship formally known as the Toastmasters International World Championship of Public Speaking, which is held annually at its International Convention in August. It started in 1938 and involves over 33,000 participants in 141 countries, making it the world's largest oratory contest. There is a six-month process of elimination to reach the semifinals; in 2018, there were 106 participants who made it that far. There are ten places in the final, and speeches are judged on content, gestures, organization, and style.

== Notable members ==
- Aubrey B. Hamilton, Missouri House of Representatives and past international president of Toastmasters

== See also ==
- Association of Speakers Clubs
- Australian Rostrum
- Communications training
- Dale Carnegie
- Public speaking
- Speakers bureau
