= Lead user =

Market research term

Lead user is a term developed by American economist Eric von Hippel.

His definition for lead user is:

1. Lead users face needs that will be general in a marketplace – but face them months or years before the bulk of that marketplace encounters them, and
2. Lead users are positioned to benefit significantly by obtaining a solution to their needs and so may innovate.

Lead users are a very important source of innovative progress because they are often pioneers – acting earlier than producers to develop important new types of products and applications. Spearheading innovation benefits lead users because they innovate to serve their own needs. For this reason, they need not concern themselves with whether others will also want what they are developing for themselves. In contrast, producers tend to wait for evidence that there is a broad, profitable market to be served before they can justify investing in a new type of innovation.

For example, mountain bikes were developed by individuals who simply wanted to bike down mountains for fun, and so invented the sport of mountain biking for themselves. Bike producers stood by, simply watching and waiting for years until the extent of the market became clear. Finally, after the new sport had spread to hundreds of enthusiasts who participated by building their own "clunker" mountain bikes, producers finally entered the new market with the first commercial mountain bike products. Because lead users develop new products and services and also modify existing ones, they are related to the creative consumer phenomenon, that is, those "customers who adapt, modify, or transform a proprietary offering".

== Lead User method ==
The Lead User method is a market research tool that has been developed to assist producers in identifying lead users' innovations, and analyzing the commercial potential of those innovations. The methodology is based upon the idea that breakthrough products can be developed by identifying leading trends and needs that already exist in marketplaces, and then developing the product specifically to cater to those trends and needs.

This method was originally developed by Dr. Eric von Hippel, and first described in the July 1986 issue of Management Science.

In contrast to traditional market research techniques, which collect information from the users at the center of the already-established target market, the Lead User method instead collects information about needs and solutions from the leading edges of the target market and from "analogue markets", made up of people who face similar problems in a more extreme form.

The Lead User methodology involves four major steps:

1. Start of the Lead User process
2. Identification of Needs and Trends
3. Identification of Lead Users and interviews
4. Concept Design (Workshop).

Once the trend or need has been identified, the developers seek out lead users: people or organizations that are attempting to solve a particularly extreme or demanding version of the stated problem.

For example, a company seeking to create a breakthrough in flashlight design may seek out groups of people who require bright, efficient, and portable lights as part of their day-to-day business. The company may identify policemen and home inspectors as lead users.

Once the lead users have been identified, networking is employed and the lead users are interviewed in order to gain insight into how these users solve the problem for themselves. The interview also includes questions that are designed to determine whether the lead users know of any individuals or organizations who are considered to be “outside the market” and have even more extreme needs. In the flashlight example, these users might be photographers, divers, or movie lighting designers.

By learning from both the lead users and the outside-the-market users, companies may identify new methods or approaches towards creating genuinely innovative products that may not have surfaced if the company had employed traditional marketing techniques.

== Review of existing literature ==
Research on lead users emerged from studies on sources of innovation. It was first found that users (as opposed to manufacturers) are often the first to develop new products that are commercially successful. Additionally, it was found that innovation by users tended to be concentrated among the “lead users” of those products and processes. These lead users were individuals or organizations who had experienced needs for a given innovation earlier than the majority of the target market. Recent research highlights the fact that lead users exist for services as well.

Various studies have explored the effectiveness of this theory in terms of identifying any user innovations. The effect found in these studies tends to be very large; for example, Urban and Von Hippel found that 82 percent of a given lead-user cluster had developed their own version of, or had modified a specific type of, the industrial product under study… whereas only 1 percent of the non-lead users had done this.

Empirical studies have also found that many of the innovations developed by users have commercial attractiveness. For example, in 1988 Urban and Von Hippel found that lead user theory can be effectively utilized in industrial software product development; in 2000 Morrison, Roberts, and Von Hippel found that many IT innovations developed by libraries had broader potential value; and in 2003 Luthje found that 48 percent of surgical innovations developed by surgeons in university clinics in Germany could be produced as commercial products.

Based on its widespread success, it has been suggested that the lead user methodology should be integrated into corporate new product development efforts. Companies may benefit (to a large extent) as they try to learn from lead users about the needs and solutions encountered at the leading edge of the market. Increasingly, this type of customer integration is being discussed among innovation management scholars. The idea is also spreading rapidly in the business world; for example, lead-user concepts developed and used at 3M showed product sales potential that was an average of eight times higher than for sales of products using more traditional development concepts / processes.

== Basic lead user search methods ==
The central task in lead user studies is searching for lead users with valuable innovations to share. Two different methods exist - one is best suited to searches for product innovations developed by consumer lead users. The second is best suited for identifying innovations developed by professional lead users like medical personnel, or by developers within firms like banks that may have developed process improvements for their own use.

=== AI search of user-generated content posted on the web ===
Lead user consumers often post descriptions of their developments openly on the web. They do this to share their development activities with peers who share the same interest. For example, parents may openly post parenting innovations on a specialized website in order to help other parents, and also to gain from improvements contributed by others. Similarly, sporting enthusiasts may post improvements they have made to sporting equipment or techniques for use and further improvement by others. Since these innovations are openly posted on the web, the posted content is searchable by AI methods. Specifically a rapid search method based upon semantic network analytic and memory model techniques has been demonstrated to be effective. In essence, the method scans thousands of websites that have been made openly available to all, searching openly posted textual content for instances that both describe an improvement in a field of interest to the searcher, and that contain phrases indicating the presence of an innovation such as "I invented" or "I solved this problem." To isolate those innovations of general interest to users, and so of potential commercial value to producers, the innovation descriptions identified are then assessed to determine how frequently they have been the subject of web searches: the higher the frequency, the higher the likelihood of commercial potential. (Individuals using this method must be sure to first check governmental rules regulating web searches: these are rapidly evolving.)

=== "Pyramiding" search processes for identifying lead user innovations not publicly posted ===
Pyramiding involves a sequence of telephonic or email interviews of experts in a professional or industrial setting. Each interviewee is initially selected on the basis of writings or reputation as someone knowledgeable in a subject of interest - for example, control of infections resulting from surgeries. Each of these interviewees is contacted and asked whether they know of someone who faces extreme problems on the topic of interest, and whether that person has innovated to their knowledge. For example, a general surgeon, when asked this question, might point to surgeons who deal with immune-compromised patients who are more likely to get infections than average patients. The individuals identified in this way are generally further up the "pyramid of expertise" than the initial interviewees. They are than contacted and interviewed in turn. From 5 to 20 of these pyramiding interviews, when carefully conducted, are generally sufficient to connect searchers with lead user innovators of the type they are seeking.

== Examples ==
Companies such as 3M, Hilti, Nortel, Sense Worldwide, and Local Motors have utilized the lead user method to create new products to satisfy the needs of specific audiences of lead-users.

== See also ==
- Alpha consumer
- Beta test
- Coolhunting
- Crossing the Chasm
- Diffusion (business)
- Diffusion of innovations
- Dominance (economics)
- Early adopter
- Eating your own dog food
- Eric von Hippel
- Experimental techniques
- Focus group
- Hipsters
- Learning-by-doing (economics)
- Observational techniques
- Participatory design
- Product lifecycle management
- Qualitative marketing research
- Quantitative marketing research
- Technology adoption lifecycle
- Toolkits for user innovation
- User innovation
- Empathic design
- Whole Product

== Bibliography ==
- Von Hippel, E. (1986), "Lead Users: A Source of Novel Product Concepts", Management Science, 32 (7): 791–806, doi:10.1287/mnsc.32.7.791, JSTOR 2631761, S2CID 154790566
- Berthon, P.R.; Pitt, L.F.; McCarthy, I.P.; Kates, S.M. (2007), "When Customers Get Clever: Managerial Approaches to Dealing with Creative Consumers", Business Horizons, 50 (1): 39–47, doi:10.1016/j.bushor.2006.05.005
- Von Hippel, E. (2005), Democratizing Innovation, Cambridge, MA: MIT Press., ISBN 9780262002745
- Urban, G.; Von Hippel, E. (1988), "Lead User Analyses for the Development of New Industrial Products", Management Science, 34 (5): 569–82, doi:10.1287/mnsc.34.5.569, hdl:1721.1/2145, JSTOR 2632079
- Von Hippel, E. (1994), "Sticky Information and the Locus of Problem Solving: Implications for Innovation", Management Science, 40 (4): 429–40, doi:10.1287/mnsc.40.4.429, hdl:1721.1/2493, JSTOR 263275
- Morrison, P.D.; Roberts, J.H.; Von Hippel, E. (2000), "Determinants of User Innovation and Innovation Sharing in a Local Market", Management Science, 46 (12): 1513–27, doi:10.1287/mnsc.46.12.1513.12076, hdl:1721.1/127231, JSTOR 2661530, S2CID 13933755
- Luthje, C.; Herstatt, C. (2004), "The Lead User Method: An Outline of Empirical Findings and Issues for Future Research", R&D Management, 34 (5): 553–68, doi:10.1111/j.1467-9310.2004.00362.x, S2CID 17430697, SSRN 610457
- Intrachooto, S. (2004), "Lead Users Concept in Building Design: Its Applicability to Member Selection in Technologically Innovative Projects", The TQM Magazine, 16 (5): 359–68, doi:10.1108/09544780410551304
- Lilien, G.; Morrison, P.D.; Searls, K.; Sonnack, M.; Von Hippel, E. (2002), "Performance Assessment of the Lead User Generation Process for New Product Development", Management Science, 48 (8): 1042–59, doi:10.1287/mnsc.48.8.1042.171, JSTOR 822674
- Shah, Sonali (May 1999), "Sources and Patterns of Innovation in a Consumer Products Field: Innovations in Sporting Equipment" (PDF), MIT Sloan School of Management Working Paper, #410
- Luthje, Christian (2000), "Characteristics of Innovating Users in a Consumer Goods Field, An empirical study of sport-related product consumers", MIT Sloan School of Management Working Paper, 24 (9): 683–695, doi:10.1016/S0166-4972(02)00150-5
- Morrison, Pamela D.; Roberts, John H.; Midgley, David F. (2002), The Nature of Lead Users and Measurement of Leading Edge Status (PDF)
- Enos, J. L. (1962), Petroleum Progress and Profits: A History of Process Innovation, Cambridge, MA: MIT Press
- Skiba, F.; Herstatt, C. (2009), "Users as sources for radical service innovations: opportunities from collaboration with service lead users", International Journal of Services Technology and Management, 12 (3): 317–37, doi:10.1504/ijstm.2009.025393
- Skiba, F. (2010), Service Users as Sources for Innovation - An Empirical Study in the German Services Industry, BoD, ISBN 978-3-8423-2609-5
- Oliveira, P.; Von Hippel, E. (2011), "Users as Service Innovators: The Case of Banking Services" (PDF), Research Policy, 40 (6): 806–18, doi:10.1016/j.respol.2011.03.009, hdl:1721.1/66265
- Enkel, Ellen; Javier, Perez-Freije; Gassmann, Oliver (December 2005). "Minimizing Market Risks Through Customer Integration in New Product Development: Learning from Bad Practice". Creativity and Innovation Management. 14 (4): 425–437. doi:10.1111/j.1467-8691.2005.00362.x.
- Coyne, W (July 2000). "Lead user: a conversation with William Coyne". Health Forum Journal. 43 (4): 28–9. PMID 11010161.
- Dehne, T. (2003). "The corporate culture and customer-inspired innovation". R. Mag. 45 (5): 11–13.
- Eisenberg, Ivy. "Lead-User Research for Breakthrough Innovation (Lead-user research can help companies uncover both unmet customer needs and the innovative solutions that leading-edge users are developing to meet those needs)". Industrial Research Institute.
