= Sticky information =

Term used in management and economics

In the field of management, sticky information is information that is costly to acquire, transfer, and use in a new location. Eric von Hippel coined the term around 1994. Because of the importance of sticky, local information for some kinds of innovation and product customization, von Hippel suggests that in certain circumstances the innovation will be increasingly accomplished by end-users (user innovation) rather than an expert provider. Toolkits for user innovation can be used to support end-users in their innovation process.

== Economics ==
In the field of economics, sticky information is related to the concept of sticky prices. That is, members of the economy are making decisions with lagged information.

== See also ==
- Configuration system
- Creativity techniques
- Crowdcasting
- Lead user
- Open Innovation
- Product differentiation
- Product management
- User innovation
