= Susumu Ogawa =

- Born: 1964 (age 61–62)
- Education: Massachusetts Institute of Technology (PhD, Management, 1998)
- Occupations: Professor of Innovation and Marketing, Kobe University
- Website: https://www.b.kobe-u.ac.jp/en/staff/ogawa.html

Susumu Ogawa (born 1964) is a professor of Innovation and Marketing, Graduate School of Business Administration, Kobe University, Japan.

He was a student of Eric von Hippel, and received a Ph.D. in management from Sloan School of Management, Massachusetts Institute of Technology (MIT), in 1998. Since September 2016, he serves as a Research Affiliate at Massachusetts Institute of Technology, Sloan School of Management. His specialty is innovation and marketing.

== Education ==
Ogawa earned a Ph.D. in management from MIT's Sloan School of Management in February 1998. He has an MA (1989) and a BA (March 1987) from Kobe University's School of Business Administration.

== Major works ==
His paper with Frank Piller, “Reducing the risks of new product development” in MIT Sloan Management Review (2006) introduced a lot of cases about crowdsourcing and crowdfunding such as Elephant Design Company, MUJI, and threadless.com, and received an overwhelming feedback from international magazines including The New York Times and Business Week.

In Fall 2011, his joint research project with Eric von Hippel and Jeroen de Jong, titled, “The Age of the Consumer-Innovator”, was published in MIT Sloan Management Review. The research is the first to compare studies of consumer innovations among countries, namely United Kingdom, United States, and Japan.

His paper in International Journal of Research in Marketing, “User-generated versus designer-generated products: A performance assessment at MUJI" (with Hidehiko Nishikawa and Martin Schreier), was selected as the runner-up of the best paper award.

== See also ==
- A Tale of User Innovation 1
- A Tale of User Innovation 2
- A Tale of User Innovation 3
