= Thomke =

Thomke is a surname. Notable people with the surname include:

- Ernst Thomke (born 1939), Swiss businessman
- Stefan Thomke, German-American economist
