= Nathan Bauman =

American drummer

Nathaniel Bauman
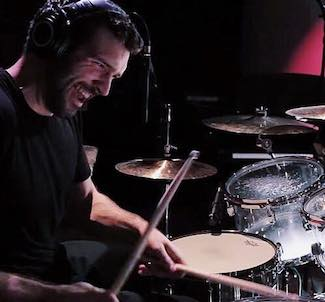
- Bauman at Audiotree Live in 2014.

Background information
- Born: June 22, 1987 (age 39); Petoskey, Michigan, U.S.
- Genres: Rock, rock and roll
- Occupations: Musician, songwriter, writer, consultant
- Instrument: Drums
- Years active: 2008–present
- Website: NateBauman.com

Nathaniel Robert Bauman (born June 22, 1987 in Petoskey, Michigan) is an American born entertainment consultant and drummer. Currently, he is the drummer for The Band Royale and a monthly contributor for the music publication Modern Drummer. Aside from drumming, he is also known for his development of various start-ups, brands, venues, musicians and athletes.

== Food & Beverage ==
Alongside celebrity nightlife operator Billy Dec and Arturo Gomez at Rockit Ranch Productions, he supported the company in opening and marketing over 5 award winning restaurants & nightclubs while serving as the company's Nightlife Director. Bauman also collaborated with the W Hotel Hollywood and Victor Drai, handling all public relations for rooftop hotspot, Drai's Hollywood.

== Music ==
In 2012, he formed The Band Royale with his brother, Joel Bauman, a well known guitarist for his popular product demos on YouTube. Bauman endorses C&C Drums. His youngest brother and amateur skateboarder, Zach Bauman, would join the group in 2014. He has worked with various other musicians, such as The Cool Kids, DJ Million $ Mano (Kanye West/Jay-Z/Travie McCoy/M.I.A.), DJ White Shadow (Lady Gaga's Born This Way producer), Matthew Santos, Malik Yusef, Rockie Fresh, GLC, Vic Mensa, John West and Midnight Conspiracy (Autograf). Bauman comes from the entertainment agency heavyweight WME Agent Training Program in Beverly Hills, called "The Harvard School of Show Business" by past graduate David Geffen.

== Startup involvement ==
Bauman has been involved with multiple startups from the beginning stages as the Head of Business Development. He is noted for being one of the first employees of shoe retailer BucketFeet and online music gear marketplace Reverb.com.

== Viral content ==
Alongside fellow The Band Royale member, he and bassist Marc Najjar performed together in YouTube video "100 Bass Riffs: A Brief History of Groove on Bass and Drums", which features the two seamlessly playing 100 popular songs in succession without stopping. It was recorded in just one take, tallying a total of 18 minutes. The video has been featured in numerous blogs and magazines and has over 3 million views to date.
