= Product life-cycle management (marketing) =

Succession of strategies by business management as a product goes through its life-cycle

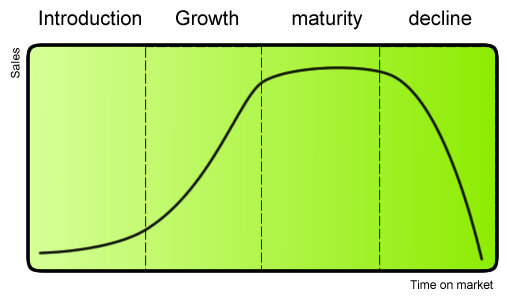
A model for the product sales lifecycle, with the assumption of four major phases: introduction, growth, maturity, and decline. Curve of sales as a function of the time of the product on the market. After a plateau in sales at product maturity, a steep decline can follow.

Product life-cycle management (PLM) is the succession of strategies by business management as a product goes through its life-cycle. The conditions in which a product is sold (advertising, saturation) changes over time and must be managed as it moves through its succession of stages. The economist Theodore Levitt referred to the concept in a 1965 Harvard Business Review article, where he observed that "most alert and thoughtful senior marketing executives", and even "a handful of uniquely cosmopolitan and up-to-date corporate presidents" were by then "familiar with the concept of the product life cycle" but needed to move forward in using it commercially.

== Goals ==
The goals of product life cycle management (PLM) are to reduce time to market, improve product quality, reduce prototyping costs, identify potential sales opportunities and revenue contributions, maintain and sustain operational serviceability, and reduce environmental impacts at end-of-life. To create successful new products the company must understand its customers, markets and competitors. PLM integrates people, data, processes and business systems. It provides product information for companies and their extended supply chain enterprise. PLM solutions help organizations overcome the increased complexity and engineering challenges of developing new products for the global competitive markets.

== Product life cycle ==
The concept of product life cycle (PLC) concerns the life of a product in the market with respect to business/commercial costs and sales measures. The product life cycle proceeds through several phases, involves many professional disciplines, and requires many skills, tools and processes. PLC management makes the following three assumptions:

- Products have a limited life and thus every product has a life cycle.
- Product sales pass through distinct stages, each posing different challenges, opportunities, and problems to the seller.
- Products require different marketing, financing, manufacturing, purchasing, and human resource strategies in each life cycle stage.

Once the product is designed and put into the market, the offering should be managed efficiently for the buyers to get value from it. Before entering into any market complete analysis is carried out by the industry for both external and internal factors including the laws and regulations, environment, economics, cultural values and market needs. From the business perspective, as a good business, the product needs to be sold before it finishes its life. In terms of profitability, expiry may jolt the overall profitability of the business therefore there are few strategies, which are practiced to ensure that the product is sold within the defined period of maturity.

=== Extending the product life cycle ===
Extending the product life cycle by improving sales, can be done through

- Advertising: Its purpose is to get additional audience and potential customers.
- Exploring and expanding to new markets: By conducting market research and offering the product (or some adapted form of it) to new markets, it is possible to get more customers.
- Price reduction: Many customers are attracted by price cuts and discount tags.
- Adding new features: Adding value to the product to enhance its usability or to attract the attention of a wider customer base.
- Packaging: New, attractive, useful or eco-friendly packaging influence the target customers.
- Changing customer consumption habits: Promoting new trends of consumption can increase the number of customers.
- Special promotions: Raising interest by offering Jackpot and other offers.
- Heightening interest: Many of the following things attract many customers who match certain profiles: eco-friendly production processes, good work conditions, funding the efforts of non-profit organizations (cancer cure, anti-war efforts, refugees, GLTBI, environment and animal protection, etc.) and the like.

All the listed techniques above rely on advertising to become known. Advertising needs the others to target other potential customers and not the same over and over again.

=== Characteristics of PLC stages ===
Four of five stages are typically used to characterise the product life cycle. Harold W. Fox referred to a five stage "sales model" in 1975, with precommercialization, market introduction, growth, maturity, and decline as his five stages. The precommercialization stage is also referred to as "development". The four stage model consists of:

| Stage | Characteristics |
|---|---|
| 1. Market introduction stage | This is the stage in which the product has been introduced first time in the market and the sales of the product starts to grow slowly and gradually and the profit received from the product is nominal and non-attained. The market for the product is not competitive initially and also the company spends initially on the advertisement and uses various other tools for promotion in order to motivate and produce awareness among the consumers, therefore generating discerning demands for particular brand. The products start to gain distribution as the product is initially new in the market and in this stage the quality of the product is not assured and the price of the product will also be determined as low or high.: 1. costs are very high 2. slow sales volumes to start 3. little or no competition 4. demand has to be created 5. customers have to be prompted to try the product 6. makes little money at this stage |
| 2. Growth stage | In the growth stage, the product is visibly present in the market, the product has habitual consumers, and there is quick growth in product sales. More new customers are becoming aware of the product and trying it. The customers are becoming satisfied with the product and are buying it again and again. The ratio of the product repetition for the trial procurement has risen. Competitors have started to overflow the market with more appealing and attractive inventions. This helps in creating increased competition in the market and also results in decreasing the product price.: 1. costs reduced due to economies of scale 2. sales volume increases significantly 3. profitability begins to rise 4. public awareness increases 5. competition begins to increase with a few new players in establishing market 6. increased competition leads to price decreases |
| 3. Maturity stage | In maturity stage, the cost of the product has been decreased because of the increased volume of the product and the product started to experience the curve effects. Also, more and more competitors have seen to be leaving the market. In this way very few buyers have been left for the product and this results in less sales of the product. The decline of the product and cost of attaining new buyers in this level is more as compare to the resulted profit. The brand or the product differentiation via rebating and discounts in price supports in recalling the outlet distribution. Also, there is a decline in the entire cost of marketing through enhancing the distribution and promotional efficiency with switching brand and segmentation.: 1. costs are decreased as a result of production volumes increasing and experience curve effects 2. sales volume peaks and market saturation is reached 3. increase in competitors entering the market 4. prices tend to drop due to the proliferation of competing products 5. brand differentiation and feature diversification is emphasized to maintain or increase market share 6. industrial profits go down |
| 4. Saturation and decline stage | In this stage, the profit as well as the sales of the product has started to decline because of the deletion of the product from the market. The market for the product in this stage started to show negative rate of growth and corroding cash flows. The product at this stage may be kept but there should be fewer adverts.: 1. costs become counter-optimal 2. sales volume decline 3. prices, profitability diminish 4. profit becomes more a challenge of production/distribution efficiency than increased sales; Note: Product termination is usually not the end of the business cycle, only the end of a single entrant within the larger scope of an ongoing business program. |

=== Utilising the product life cycle ===
Whilst Levitt noted that the concept of the product life cycle was well-known, he argued that it was being underused and had greater potential to support business strategies than had been considered at that time. Three "operating questions" which he put forward for business executives to ask and answer were concerned with:

1. predicting the shape and duration of each stage;
2. determining a product's current stage in the cycle;
3. making use of this assessment.

Identifying the stage of a product is an art rather than a science, but it is possible to find patterns in some of the general product features at each stage. Identifying product stages when the product is in transition is very difficult. More recently, it has been shown that user-generated contents (UGC) (e.g., in the form of online product reviews) has the potential to reveal buyer personality characteristics that can in turn be used to identify product life cycle stage.

| Identifying features | Stages | | | |
| Identifying features | Introduction | Growth | Maturity | Decline |
| Sales | Low | High | High | Low |
| Investment cost | Very high | High (lower than intro stage) | Low | Low |
| Competition | Low or no competition | High | Very high | Very High |
| Profit | Low | High | High | Low |

== See also ==
- Application lifecycle management
- Brand awareness
- Consumer behaviour
- Crossing the Chasm
- Diminishing manufacturing sources and material shortages (DMSMS)
- Material selection
- New product development
- Obsolescence
- Open Innovation
- Planned obsolescence
- Product lifecycle management
- Product management
- Software product management
- Technology life cycle
- Toolkits for user innovation
