= Empathy map =

Visualization tool in design

An empathy map is a widely used visualization tool within the field of user experience design and human–computer interaction practice. In relation to empathic design, the primary purpose of an empathy map is to bridge the understanding of the end user. Within context of its application, this tool is used to build a shared understanding of the user's needs and provide context to a user-centered solution.

== Structure ==
The traditional empathy map begins with four categories: says, thinks, does, and feels. At the center of the map, a user or user persona is displayed to remind practitioners and stakeholders what type of individual this research is centered around. Each category of the empathy map represents a snapshot of the user's thoughts and feelings without any chronological order.

- Says category contains what the user says out loud during research or testing. Ideally, each point is written down as close to the user's original words as possible.
- Thinks category contains what the user is thinking. While content may overlap with the Says category, Thinks category exists to capture thoughts users may not want to share willing due to social factors, such as self-consciousness or politeness.
- Does category contains the user's action and behaviors. This contains what the user is physically doing and captures what actions users are taking.
- Feels category contains the user's emotional state in context with their experience. This typically contains information or phrases as to how they feel about the experience.

However, as time evolved, the empathy map has been updated to provide more context and information architecture within the industry.

Empathy maps could vary in forms, but they have common core elements. Other than the four traditional categories mentioned above, empathy map could also include other categories. Here are two other categories commonly used:

- See category contains information users observed through eyes. It could be what users see in the marketplace or in the immediate environment, other people's saying and doing, or the content they watch or read.
- Hear category is what user hears and how that impacts the user. It could be personal connections as well as other recourses such as media. Instead of documenting superficial information streams, team should focus on details that influence the user.

== Empathy map vs. persona ==
It is easy to confuse the use of empathy map and persona. They are both important and common tools used in the research process. Here's the main difference:

- Empathy map occurs in the early research process. It is used to get into user's head and heart. Empathy map helps to picture user's situation as well as to consider what future researches might be needed.
- Persona is more definite and formal. In order to generate a well-build persona for addressing needs and problems, the team needs to conduct in-depth research. Personas are better leveraged later on in the process
- Typically, persona are created based on a empathy map and focus on what that says, thinks, does, or feels. Therefore, an empathy map could be considered as a subset of a persona focusing on a specific area.
