= VCE =

VCE may refer to:

== Education ==
- Victorian Certificate of Education, a senior secondary school qualification in Victoria, Australia
- Vocational Certificate of Education, a further education qualification in the United Kingdom
- Vaagdevi College of Engineering, a college in Telangana, India

== Technology ==
- Virtual Computing Environment, a former division of EMC Corporation originally created in collaboration with Cisco Systems
- Video Coding Engine, a video data processing hardware component
- Variable cycle engine, an aircraft thrust engine type

== Other uses ==
- Venice Marco Polo Airport, Italy, by IATA airport code
- Videocapsule endoscopy
- Virtual customer environment, a web-based forum
