= Demand articulation =

Demand articulation is a concept developed within the scientific field of innovation studies which serves to explain learning processes about needs for new and emerging technologies. Emerging technologies are technologies in their early phase of development, which have not resulted in concrete products yet. Many characteristics of these technologies, such as the technological aspects but also the needs of users concerning the technology, have not been specified yet. Demand articulation can be defined as ‘iterative, inherently creative processes in which stakeholders try to address what they perceive as important characteristics of and attempt to unravel preferences for an emerging innovation’.

The approach may be applied to describing the processes by which needs for emerging technologies become more concrete over time. At the same time, demand articulation can also be perceived as learning processes that can be evaluated.

== Background ==
The concept of demand articulation originates from the theoretical school that explains innovations as a result of the co-evolution of technological developments and societal pressures. The central idea behind this school is that innovations are not only deterministically formed following technological considerations and possibilities, but in interaction with societal aspects, such as ethical questions, user demands, implementation issues.

In the emergent phase, several aspects of the technology remain rather ‘fluid’ and can be formed by stakeholders involved. In this period, co-evolution of society and technology takes place, and ‘societal entrenchment of a technology’ is carried by different processes in which several aspects of the technology become articulated over time. In the 1990s, the term "articulation processes" was introduced, including articulation of technology specifications, of product and maintenance networks, of cultural and political acceptability, and of demands.

Demand articulation processes owe much to the work of Teubal, in which he stated that in existing markets users have defined their needs quite precisely, and prices (also of competitors) play a major role in sales decisions. With breakthrough, radical, emerging technologies there are no markets and needs in place. Producers can only offer blueprints. However, users might not have thought of the direction of solutions the new product offers, and the regime as a whole might even change as a result of the innovation, which both can lead to different preferences of users.

In order to deal with the determination of user preferences in the context of emerging technologies, Teubal introduced the term market determinateness as “the degree of specificity of the market signals received by the innovating firm and consequently to the extent to which it anticipates demand. In order to explain the concept, we introduce four types of market signals, in ascending order of specificity: (1) signals about a need; (2) signals about a product class; (3) signals about basic functions; (4) signals about product specifications.” Ideally, as a technology emerges and several of its aspects become clear, users are also becoming specific about their ‘market signals’ or demands.

Kodama later picked up market determinateness or demand articulation, which he defined as “a dynamic interaction of technological activities that involves integrating potential demands into a product concept and decomposing this product concept into development agendas for its individual component technologies”. Building on this, the term ‘latent demand’ was introduced, which means that most stakeholders will not have an evident idea of what they want from the start. An actor might have a certain need that is ill-defined or latent, but which, in a sense, cannot be denied. For example, there have been an evident need for communication over long distances and even a then-farfetched idea of mobile communication devices, but the precise need for mobile phones (or SMS services for that matter) could not be foreseen before the introduction of these devices. The demand articulation process, therefore, is the start of a consciousness-raising exercise in which demands become increasingly concrete.

== Definition of demand ==
The definition of demand merits special attention in the context of demand articulation. A clear distinction should be made between two types of demands:

- Economic or market demand, i.e., actor X wants a product and is prepared to pay a certain price);
- Substantive demand, i.e., actor X has ideas about how to develop a new technology.

Following the distinction made by Teubal above, substantive demand are more relevant in the emergent phase of technological development. Mowery and Rosenberg underline this by criticising the use of “the rather shapeless and elusive notion of [market] ‘needs’”.

Demands should be regarded as a broad concept that includes a range of concepts varying in level of determinedness and varying in content areas. Concerning the varying degree of concreteness, demands include (ranging from less to more concrete):

- Science fictions, (guiding) visions, mission statements, ‘Leitbilder’, expectations or promises, being real-time representations of future technological situations and capabilities. They include statements on the future (‘we expect…’, ‘we anticipate…’, etc.). Visions are “mental images of an attainable future shared by a collection of actors; they guide the actions of and interactions between those actors”.
- Perceptions of problems and obstacles with existing products or situations.
- Ideas and solutions: the actor acknowledges a problem, knows a direction for solutions, and has some concrete ideas about how this end state should be reached.
- Concrete and latent needs for existing and non-existing products: “user needs in general are the preferences of the user for the properties of the service or alternatively for the performance dimensions of the product”.
- Concerns about ethical, legal and social implications (ELSI) regarding new technologies.

Concerning the content range, demands may include cultural, political, ethical, social issues, because in early stages of technology development it is unclear which issues would become important in steering, and because user preferences are diverse and partially dependent on these issues.

== Demand articulation and innovation ==
Users of products and services have the potential to contribute to innovation processes and to the success of eventual innovations. In the 1970s the Science Policy Research Unit (SPRU) conducted the SAPPHO-study in which resembling successful and unsuccessful innovations were compared. “The single measure that discriminated most clearly between success and failure was ‘user needs understood’”. Building on this finding, Von Hippel and his colleagues found that users were major sources or “loci” of innovations in several sectors. Not only do users point to directions of future needs, but they could also have first-hand information on new research directions, ideas, problems, and solutions.

The role of demand-side actors has also been studied in a more holistic way in the innovation system literature. Here, users – and also intermediary organizations – appear as major actors that are engaged in demand articulation processes. Innovation occurs at the intersection of needs and opportunities, both of which show a large degree of variability and unpredictability. This requires not only exchange of information on qualities and costs of innovations, but also of information on the (technological and user-related) contents of these innovations. This content needs to be communicated. The major role of knowledge in user-producer interactions calls for an emphasis on interactive learning; to innovate successfully, producers constantly need to learn about the technological possibilities as well as about user needs.

These interactive learning processes in which demands for (characteristics of) innovations are increasingly better understood can be regarded as demand articulation.

== Demand articulation in public innovation policy ==
In the light of the benefits of understanding user needs, poorly articulated demand is regarded as one of the systemic failures that innovation systems can face. Demand articulation, strategy and vision development should be stimulated. Public innovation policy can contribute to this by contemplating the use of demand-oriented policy instruments, besides supply-, diffusion- and infrastructure-oriented instruments. Examples of demand-oriented innovation policy instruments are public procurement, visioning exercises to produce R&D agendas and facilitate user-producer interactions in local, experimental transdisciplinary settings.

In several countries, including Germany and the Netherlands, demand-oriented innovation policy gradually gained momentum.
