= Karim R. Lakhani =

Professor at Harvard Business School

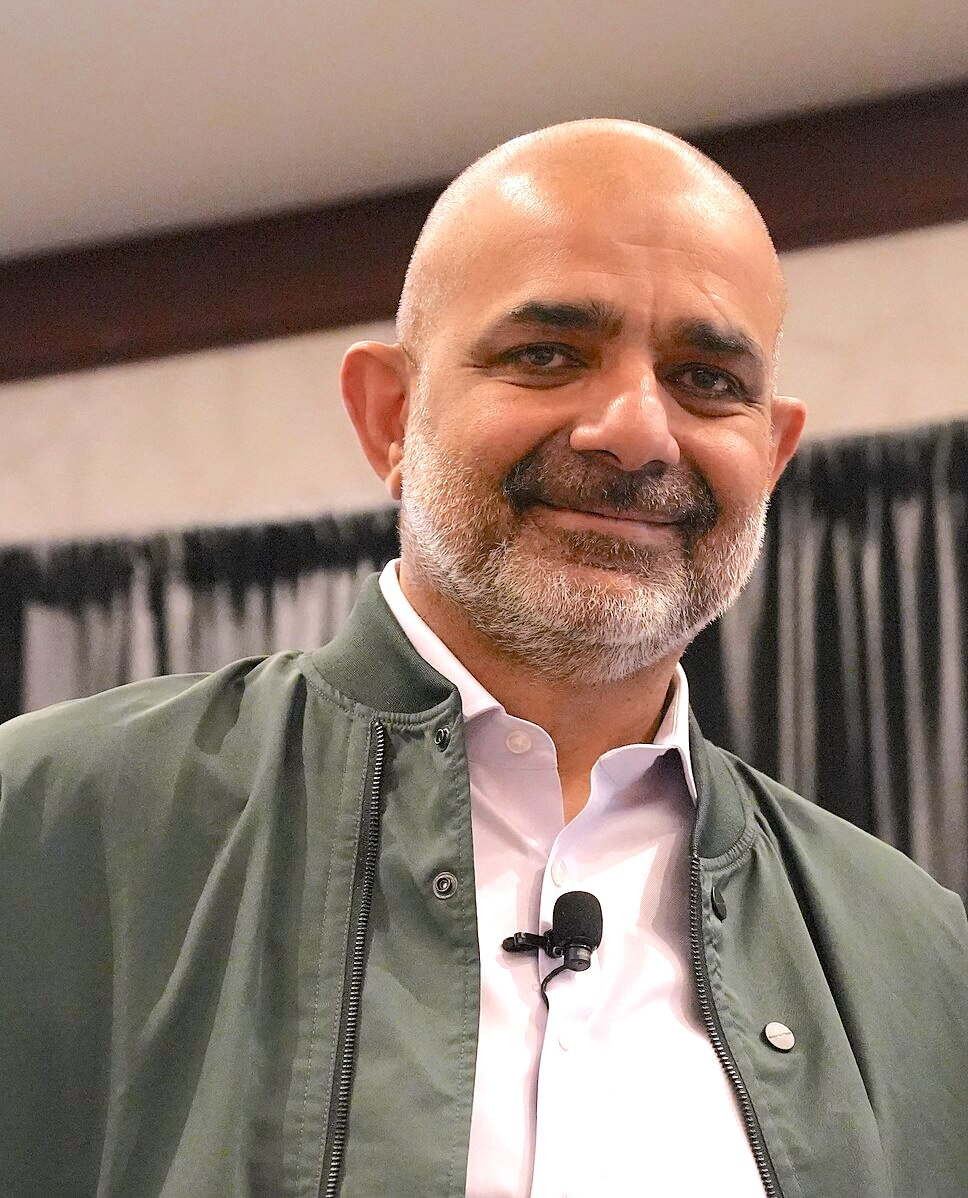
Lakhani at SXSW 2025

Karim R. Lakhani (born c. 1970) is the Dorothy & Michael Hintze Professor of Business Administration at Harvard Business School. He is the principal investigator of the Crowd Innovation Lab at the Harvard Institute for Quantitative Social Science. His research and teaching focuses on open innovation and user innovation. Lakhani is the founder and one of the principal investigators of the Laboratory for Innovation Science at Harvard (LISH).

== Life and work ==
Lakhani earned a Bachelor in Engineering Management in 1993 at McMaster University, a Master of Science in Technology and Policy in 1999, and a Ph.D. in Management in 2006 at the MIT Sloan School of Management. His Ph.D. dissertation was advised by Eric von Hippel, with Tom Allen and Wanda Orlikowski.

Lakhani edited the book Perspectives on Free and Open Source Software (ISBN 0-262-06246-1) published by MIT Press.

In addition to Open Source, Lakhani also studies crowdsourcing. In particular, he is known for his research on the T-shirt company Threadless, and prize-based open innovation firms like InnoCentive & Topcoder.

== Selected publications ==
- Lakhani, Karim R., and Eric Von Hippel. "How open source software works:"free" user-to-user assistance." Research policy 32.6 (2003): 923-943.
- Lakhani, Karim R. and Wolf, Robert G., Why Hackers Do What They Do: Understanding Motivation and Effort in Free/Open Source Software Projects (September 2003).
- Jeppesen, Lars Bo, and Karim R. Lakhani. "Marginality and Problem-Solving Effectiveness in Broadcast Search." Organization Science 21: 1016–1033.
- Von Krogh, Georg, Sebastian Spaeth, and Karim R. Lakhani. "Community, joining, and specialization in open source software innovation: a case study." Research Policy 32.7 (2003): 1217-1241.
- Kevin J. Boudreau, Nicola Lacetera, Karim R. Lakhani. "Incentives and Problem Uncertainty in Innovation Contests: An Empirical Analysis." Management Science 57.5 (2011): 843-863.
- Joel West and Karim R. Lakhani. "Getting Clear About Communities in Open Innovation." Industry & Innovation 15.2 (2009): 223-231.
- Lakhani, Karim R., and Jill A. Panetta. "The Principles of Distributed Innovation." Innovations: Technology, Governance, Globalization 2, 3: 97–112.
- Lane et al. "Conservatism Gets Funded? A Field Experiment on the Role of Negative Information in Novel Project Evaluation." Management Science 68.6 (2022): 4478-4495.
- Jacqueline N. Lane, Ina Ganguli, Patrick Gaule, Eva Guinan, Karim R. Lakhani. "Engineering serendipity: When does knowledge sharing lead to knowledge production?." Strategic Management Journal 42.6 (2020): 1215-1244.
