= John C. Mankins =

Former NASA physicist

John C. Mankins is a former NASA physicist known for his work on space-based solar power.

Mankins holds a Bachelor of Science from Harvey Mudd College, a Master of Science in physics from UCLA, and an MBA in Public Policy Analysis from The Drucker School at Claremont Graduate University. His 25-year career at NASA and CalTech's Jet Propulsion Laboratory (JPL) ranged from flight projects and space mission operations, to systems level innovation and advanced technology research & development management.

Mankins is currently (2018) President of Artemis Innovation Management Solutions.

== NASA career ==
For 10 years, he was a manager in the Office of Advanced Concepts and Technology (Code C) at NASA Headquarters, and the lead for critical studies of space solar power, highly reusable space transportation, affordable human exploration approaches, and other topics. He was the creator or co-creator of numerous novel concepts, including the ‘MagLifter’ electromagnetic launch assist system, the Internet-based NASA ‘Virtual Research Center’ the ‘Solar Clipper’ interplanetary transport vehicle, the ‘SunTower’ space solar power system, the ‘Hybrid Propellant Module’ for in-space refueling, the ‘HabBot’ mobile planetary outpost architecture, the Advanced Technology Life cycle Analysis System (ATLAS), and others. Following dissolution of the Advanced Concepts office by Administrator Goldin, Mr. Mankins was the manager of Exploration Systems Research and Technology within the Exploration Systems Mission Directorate with responsibility for an $800M annual budget, involving more than 100 individual projects and over 3,000 personnel.

In recognition of his accomplishments, he has received numerous awards and honors, including the NASA Exceptional Technology Achievement Medal in 2003 (of which he was the first recipient).

He left NASA in 2005.

=== Power satellites ===
During the late 1990s Mankins led the NASA team that wrote "A Fresh Look at Space Solar Power". The report of that work was published by the IAF. He testified about Space Solar Power to the U.S. House of Representatives Science Committee in 2000.

He co-chaired the IAA's Study on Space Solar Power, which was the first international study carried out on this concept.

His work transmitting microwaves between two Hawaiian Islands in 2008 is mentioned in this 2014 IEEE Spectrum article.

In addition to his many technical publication, Mankins authored The Case for Space Solar Power, a text on space-based solar power systems.

=== Technology readiness level ===
Building on the original NASA "technology readiness level" (TRL) scale for technology assessment (defined first with 6 or 7 levels in the 1970s), Mankins extended the scale to flight systems and operations in the late 1980s (TRLs 8 and 9), published the first detailed definitions of the TRLs in 1995 that discussed NASA's use of TRLs and proposed expanded descriptions for each TRL, and promoted the use of the scale by the US Department of Defense in the late 1990s.

== Society Memberships ==
He is a member of the board of directors of the National Space Society (NSS), a member of the International Academy of Astronautics (IAA) and chair of the Academy Commission III (Space Systems and Technology Development); and a member of the International Astronautical Federation (IAF), the American Institute of Aeronautics and Astronautics (AIAA), and the Sigma Xi Research Honor Society.
