= Sense Worldwide =

- Type: Private
- Industry: Strategy Consulting
- Founded: London, United Kingdom 1999
- Key people: Jeremy Brown, CEO
- Website: www.senseworldwide.com

Sense Worldwide is a London-based co-creation consultancy. In 1999 it started the Sense Network, described as ‘one of the earliest web-based communities’. It was one of the first commercial practitioners of co-creation and Extreme User Research. It has influenced the development of Nike Sportswear and Habbo Hotel among many others. It has received funding from NESTA. Nesta named Sense Worldwide alongside Lego and Google as one of the 'Open 100' companies that pioneered open innovation.

== The Sense Network ==
The Sense Network has 5,000+ members in over 1,000 cities. Membership attracts radical thinkers, extreme users, creative outliers, misfits, rebels and the crazy ones.

Chief spin-doctor and strategist for Tony Blair, Alastair Campbell wrote in Winners: And How They Succeed about Sense Worldwide saying “their approach to innovation is to bring in ‘oddballs, freaks, kids, the marginalised, to find out how they’re thinking”.

Sense Worldwide’s innovative approach and how to make a creative leap from analytical thinking to breakthrough thinking was covered in the book Dream Teams by Shane Snow.

Professor Patrick Reinmoeller of Cranfield University and Alessandro Giudici of Cass have written two academic papers about the scientific validity of this approach, titled 'Transforming the Rules of Innovation (A) & (B).

== Co-creation ==
Sense Worldwide has used co-creation in its work from its inception. Its work in this area has caused it to be listed as one of the NESTA Open 100. It has also pioneered the commercial use of extreme user research, building on the Lead User ideas of MIT's Eric von Hippel

Sense Worldwide introduced co-creation techniques to Nike and continues to work with Nike’s running, sportswear and football businesses. It authored the Discovery Channel report into the lives of young men in Europe, and it contributes to the Economist Intelligence Unit's reports and the Harvard Business Review

Sense Worldwide’s recent rebranding of the Young Vic Theatre in London resulted in the abandonment of its sit-anywhere policy and its new strapline, “It’s a big world in here”

In partnership with Sense Worldwide The Sense Network has worked on over 500 projects for large multi-national brands. One example is the creation of General Electric’s Opal Nugget Ice Maker, in which water sommeliers and expert cocktail makers were enlisted to co-create concepts. The Indiegogo campaign raised more than $2.7M making it the 9th most backed project on the platform in 2015.

== Sense Worldwide in popular culture ==
No Wax

In London in 2003 Sense Worldwide launched the first iPod DJ night with NoWax. There was no DJ. Instead dancers took turns to play floor-filling music in the night club. Resources for the event were open sourced, and NoWax nights have been staged in cities from Derby to Singapore and Tokyo.

I Heart My Chair

In 2007 the Sense Network was asked to photograph and write about their favourite place to sit. The resulting book, I Heart my Chair, was widely distributed.

I Heart MyT-Shirt

Building on the success of its I Heart My Chair initiative the Sense Network launched a campaign to find people’s favourite T-shirts.
