= Commercial readiness level =

Commercial or Business Readiness Level (CRL / BRL, same) assesses the readiness of the business model of the investment project on a scale of 1-9. Some local frameworks use 1-5 levels only.

For grant or investment assessment purposes it is common to refer to Technology Readiness Level or TRL (EU format) that allows the investor to see the risk level of the proposed project, the expected life cycle of the development and the likely timeframe of the investment. It is possible to have a gap between CRL and TRL, a great product can be manufacturing ready and yet have zero market testing or sales process validation.

For startups and inventors it is a good framework to understand the current status of the product and the steps needed to take before the market can really validate the concept. Potential customers need to turn to valid customers and then buying customers, the roadmap leading to it is a requirement for investment preparation.

CRL assessment (after TRL is concluded) is part of the ISO 56000:2025 model to evaluate innovation methodology of a company.

== Definitions ==
CRL	Definition
1	Commercial viability only exists as an assumption, potentially validated by own need.
2	Relationship to market is assessed, competitors identified.
3	Proven end-user exists. Prototypes are demonstrated.
4	Identify regulatory and supply chain dependencies and requirements. Unit costs calculated.
5	Financial model for sales, costs and margins established. In theory it would make profit. Go-to-market ready.
6	Confirm exploitation routes; form partnerships across the value chain; certification and regulatory requirements started.
7	Financial model/commercial viability validated with valid customers (someone is ready to pay for it).
8	First commercial system running; delivery system to market established; earlier market assumptions updated.
9	Capable to supply market demand, first commercial revenue.

== TRL and CRL(BRL) relationship ==
It is likely, that the development of the product follows the development of the business model. It is clearly in the interest of the developer to know whether the technology would be marketable besides just being happy that it is working well in the lab.

The TRL-CRL gap has a direct consequence on the speed and success of the development process. If the TRL significantly exceeds CRL/BRL, we expect to see sunk costs in the product that impose an elevated risk on the investor's side. When CRL is standing much higher, the company is selling hype (which may be well grounded, but is a risk nonetheless). There is an optimal band along the TRL/CRL line (x=y) where risks are minimized.

"It is important to keep in mind that startup investors invest in businesses, not technologies. They profit when the business makes money, not just when the technology works. Investors want to see startup founders make progress on both the commercialization and technology development."

In innovation management, the biggest obstacle to get involved in the development of a technology invented by a private person (inventor) is exactly this gap. The inventor has a magically working product with the intellectual property is not yet protected and validation requires access to such embedded secrets. Potential buyers however want to see and understand what they buy, while investors want to tackle the technology scaling viability and manufacturing risks first. This means that the TRL has a ceiling (between the lab and the manufacturing line) and BRL gets blocked around Level 3 or 4 with a potential stalemate. See also, Walley of Death in TRL process.
