= Technology adoption life cycle =

Sociological model

Rogers' bell curve

The technology adoption lifecycle is a sociological model that describes the adoption or acceptance of a new product or innovation, according to the demographic and psychological characteristics of defined adopter groups. The process of adoption over time is typically illustrated as a classical normal distribution or "bell curve". The model calls the first group of people to use a new product "innovators", followed by "early adopters". Next come the "early majority" and "late majority", and the last group to eventually adopt a product are called "laggards" or "phobics". For example, a phobic may only use a cloud service when it is the only remaining method of performing a required task, but the phobic may not have an in-depth technical knowledge of how to use the service.

The demographic and psychological (or "psychographic") profiles of each adoption group were originally specified by agricultural researchers in 1956:

- innovators – had larger farms, were more educated, more prosperous and more risk-oriented
- early adopters – younger, more educated, tended to be community leaders, less prosperous
- early majority – more conservative but open to new ideas, active in community and influence to neighbors
- late majority – older, less educated, fairly conservative and less socially active
- laggards – very conservative, had small farms and capital, oldest and least educated

The model has subsequently been adapted for many areas of technology adoption in the late 20th century, for example in the spread of policy innovations among U.S. states.

== Adaptations of the model ==
The model has spawned a range of adaptations that extend the concept or apply it to specific domains of interest.

In his book Crossing the Chasm, Geoffrey Moore proposes a variation of the original lifecycle. He suggests that for discontinuous innovations, which may result in a Foster disruption based on an s-curve, there is a gap or chasm between the first two adopter groups (innovators/early adopters), and the vertical markets.

Disruption as it is used today are of the Clayton M. Christensen variety. These disruptions are not s-curve based.

In educational technology, Lindy McKeown has provided a similar model (a pencil metaphor) describing the Information and Communications Technology uptake in education.

In medical sociology, Carl May has proposed normalization process theory that shows how technologies become embedded and integrated in health care and other kinds of organization.

Wenger, White and Smith, in their book Digital habitats: Stewarding technology for communities, talk of technology stewards: people with sufficient understanding of the technology available and the technological needs of a community to steward the community through the technology adoption process.

Rayna and Striukova (2009) propose that the choice of initial market segment has crucial importance for crossing the chasm, as adoption in this segment can lead to a cascade of adoption in the other segments. This initial market segment has, at the same time, to contain a large proportion of visionaries, to be small enough for adoption to be observed from within the segment and from other segment and be sufficiently connected with other segments. If this is the case, the adoption in the first segment will progressively cascade into the adjacent segments, thereby triggering the adoption by the mass-market.

Stephen L. Parente (1995) implemented a Markov Chain to model economic growth across different countries given different technological barriers.

In Product marketing, Warren Schirtzinger proposed an expansion of the original lifecycle (the Customer Alignment Lifecycle) which describes the configuration of five different business disciplines that follow the sequence of technology adoption.

== Examples ==
One way to model product adoption is to understand that people's behaviors are influenced by their peers and how widespread they think a particular action is. For many format-dependent technologies, people have a non-zero payoff for adopting the same technology as their closest friends or colleagues. If two users both adopt product A, they might get a payoff a > 0; if they adopt product B, they get b > 0. But if one adopts A and the other adopts B, they both get a payoff of 0.

A threshold can be set for each user to adopt a product. Say that a node v in a graph has d neighbors: then v will adopt product A if a fraction p of its neighbors is greater than or equal to some threshold. For example, if v's threshold is 2/3, and only one of its two neighbors adopts product A, then v will not adopt A. Using this model, we can deterministically model product adoption on sample networks.

== History ==
The technology adoption lifecycle is a sociological model that is an extension of an earlier model called the diffusion process, which was originally published in 1956 by George M. Beal and Joe M. Bohlen. This article did not acknowledge the contributions of Beal's Ph.D. student Everett M. Rogers; however Beal, Bohlen and Rogers soon co-authored a scholarly article on their methodology. This research built on prior work by Neal C. Gross and Bryce Ryan.

Rogers generalized the diffusion process to innovations outside the agricultural sector of the midwestern USA, and successfully popularized his generalizations in his widely acclaimed 1962 book Diffusion of Innovations (now in its fifth edition).

== See also ==
- Bass diffusion model
- Diffusion (business)
- Hype cycle
- Lazy user model
- Neo-Luddism
- Technology acceptance model
- Technology lifecycle
- Varian Rule
