= Mature technology =

A mature technology is a technology that has been in use for long enough that most of its initial faults and inherent problems have been removed or reduced by further development. In some contexts, it may also refer to technology that has not seen widespread use, but whose scientific background is well understood. Its performance characteristics are also expected to be well understood with well-established design specifications.

One of the key indicators of a mature technology is the ease of use for both non-experts and professionals. Another indicator is a reduction in the rate of new breakthrough advances related to it—whereas inventions related to a (popular) immature technology are usually rapid and diverse, and may change the whole use paradigm—advances to a mature technology are usually incremental improvements only.

== Examples ==
The QWERTY keyboard design is an example of mature technology because its performance characteristics such as typing speeds and error rates have been established in various describable situations. Additionally, the basic key organization of this technology has remained the same over the last century. Another example is the barcode, a technology that also satisfies all the previously cited indicators. It is widely used since when it was first introduced it was an open technology made available in the public domain where anyone had access.

Other mature technologies include the following:

- Farming, most advances are in slight improvements of breeds or in pest reduction.
- Telephone, though considered mature, mobile phones showed a rare potential for substantial changes even in such technologies.
- Watch, most ordinary watch movements have the same or very similar components. Most advances are with additional complications in the movement or with sub-dials and other aesthetics on the dial.
- Bicycle, a mature form of transport in that it is easy to learn, simple, affordable, and improves a person's ability to travel without inhibiting others' ability to do so

=== Technologies not yet fully mature ===
- Motor vehicle, widely used by non-experts, but require significant infrastructure and sacrifices to public space.
- Internet, with still partly conflicting technological and human standards.
- Computers, becoming more mature due to advances in user-friendly operating systems and the decline of Moore's law.
- Economic models, still shows high failure rates in economic prediction.
- Distributed ledger technology is currently used in a limited number of applications mainly being blockchains, though ongoing research and potential use cases are currently being explored.

=== Immature technologies ===
- Nanotechnology, actual industrial applications limited so far.
- Biotechnology, which still does not solve most health and ecologic human challenges.
- Quantum computers, so far mostly a theoretical concept.
- Nuclear fusion power, mainly theoretical due to the containment energy expenditure thus far outweighs yielded energy in practice.
- Virtual reality, whilst practical systems exist, the potential roadmap is estimated to require a lifetime of advances in many fields.

== See also ==
- Business cycle
- Technology lifecycle
- Technology readiness level
