= Diffusion (business) =

Process by which the market accepts a new idea or product

In business, diffusion is the process by which a new idea or new product is accepted by the market. The rate of diffusion is the speed with which the new idea spreads from one consumer to the next. Adoption is the reciprocal process as viewed from a consumer perspective rather than distributor; it is similar to diffusion except that it deals with the psychological processes an individual goes through, rather than an aggregate market process.

== Theories ==
There are several theories that purport to explain the mechanics of diffusion:

- The two-step hypothesis – information and acceptance flows, via the media, first to opinion leaders, then to the general population
- Trickle-down fashion – products tend to be expensive at first, and therefore only accessible to the wealthy social strata – in time they become less expensive and are diffused to lower and lower strata.
- The Everett Rogers Diffusion of innovations theory – for any new idea, concept, product or method, there are five categories of adopters:
  - Innovators – venturesome, educated, multiple info sources;
  - Early adopters – social leaders, popular, educated;
  - Early majority – deliberate, many informal social contacts;
  - Late majority – skeptical, traditional, lower socio-economic status;
  - Laggards – neighbors and friends are main info sources, fear of debt.
- The Chasm model developed by Lee James and Warren Schirtzinger - Originally named The Marketing Chasm, this model overlays Everett Rogers' adoption curve with a gap between early adopters and the early majority. Chasm theory is only applicable to discontinuous innovations, which are those that impose a change of behavior, new learning, or a new process on the buyer or end user. And the pre-requisite for a chasm or gap to exist in the adoption lifecycle is the innovation must be discontinuous.
- Technology driven models – These are particularly relevant to software diffusion. The rate of acceptance of technology is determined by factors such as ease of use and usefulness.

== Rate ==
According to Everett M. Rogers, the rate of diffusion is influenced by:

- The product's perceived advantage or benefit.
- Riskiness of purchase.
- Ease of product use – complexity of the product.
- Immediacy of benefits.
- Observability.
- Trialability.
- Price.
- Extent of behavioral changes required.
- Return on investment in the case of industrial products.

=== Models ===
There are several types of diffusion rate models:

1. Penetration models – use test market data to develop acceptance equations of expected sales volume as a function of time. Three examples of penetration models are:
  - Bass trial only model
  - Bass declining trial model
  - Fourt and Woodlock model
2. Trial/Repeat models – number of repeat buyers is a function of the number of trial buyers.
3. Deterministic models – assess number of buyers at various states of acceptance – later states are determined from calculations to previous states.
4. Stochastic models – recognize that many elements of the diffusion process are unknown but explicitly incorporate probabilistic terms.

== See also ==
- Bass diffusion model
- Coolhunting
- Diffusion (anthropology)
- Diffusion of innovations
- Early adopter
- Marketing
- Marketing management
- Marketing plan
- New Product Development
- Percolation
- Product life-cycle management
- Technology Adoption Lifecycle
- Technology lifecycle
