= Technology readiness level =

Method for estimating the maturity of technologies

NASA technology readiness levels

Technology readiness levels (TRLs) are a method for estimating the maturity of technologies during the acquisition phase of a program. TRLs enable consistent and uniform discussions of technical maturity across different types of technology. TRL is determined during a technology readiness assessment (TRA) that examines program concepts, technology requirements, and demonstrated technology capabilities. TRLs are based on a scale from 1 to 9 with 9 being the most mature technology.

TRL was developed at NASA during the 1970s. The US Department of Defense has used the scale for procurement since the early 2000s. By 2008 the scale was also in use at the European Space Agency (ESA). The European Commission advised EU-funded research and innovation projects to adopt the scale in 2010. TRLs were consequently used in 2014 in the European Union (EU) Horizon 2020 program. In 2013, the TRL scale was further canonized by the International Organization for Standardization (ISO) with the publication of the ISO 16290:2013 standard.

A comprehensive approach and discussion of TRLs has been published by the European Association of Research and Technology Organisations. Extensive criticism of the adoption of the TRL scale by the EU was published in The Innovation Journal, stating that the "concreteness and sophistication of the TRL scale gradually diminished as its usage spread outside its original context (space programs)".

== Definitions ==
TRL	NASA usage	European Union
1	Basic principles observed and reported	Basic principles observed
2	Technology concept and/or application formulated	Technology concept formulated
3	Analytical and experimental critical function and/or characteristic proof-of concept	Experimental proof of concept
4	Component and/or breadboard validation in laboratory environment	Technology validated in lab
5	Component and/or breadboard validation in relevant environment	Technology validated in relevant environment (industrially relevant environment in the case of key enabling technologies)
6	System/subsystem model or prototype demonstration in a relevant environment (ground or space)	Technology demonstrated in relevant environment (industrially relevant environment in the case of key enabling technologies)
7	System prototype demonstration in a space environment	System prototype demonstration in operational environment
8	Actual system completed and "flight qualified" through test and demonstration (ground or space)	System complete and qualified
9	Actual system "flight proven" through successful mission operations	Actual system proven in operational environment (competitive manufacturing in the case of key enabling technologies; or in space)

== Assessment tools ==
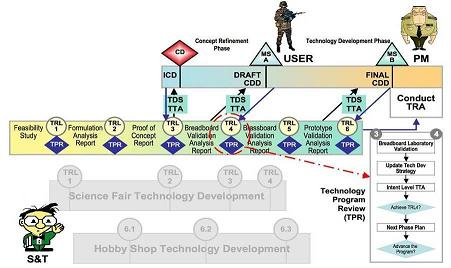
DAU Decision Point / TPMM Transition Mechanisms

A Technology Readiness Level Calculator was developed by the United States Air Force. This tool is a standard set of questions implemented in Microsoft Excel that produces a graphical display of the TRLs achieved. This tool is intended to provide a snapshot of technology maturity at a given point in time.

The Defense Acquisition University (DAU) Decision Point (DP) Tool originally named the Technology Program Management Model was developed by the United States Army and later adopted by the DAU. The DP/TPMM is a TRL-gated high-fidelity activity model that provides a flexible management tool to assist Technology Managers in planning, managing, and assessing their technologies for successful technology transition. The model provides a core set of activities including systems engineering and program management tasks that are tailored to the technology development and management goals. This approach is comprehensive, yet it consolidates the complex activities that are relevant to the development and transition of a specific technology program into one integrated model.

== Uses ==
The primary purpose of using technology readiness levels is to help management in making decisions concerning the development and transitioning of technology. It is one of several tools that are needed to manage the progress of research and development activity within an organization.

Among the advantages of TRLs:

- Provides a common understanding of technology status
- Risk management
- Used to make decisions concerning technology funding
- Used to make decisions concerning transition of technology

Some of the characteristics of TRLs that limit their utility:

- Readiness does not necessarily fit with appropriateness or technology maturity
- A mature product may possess a greater or lesser degree of readiness for use in a particular system context than one of lower maturity
- Numerous factors must be considered, including the relevance of the products' operational environment to the system at hand, as well as the product-system architectural mismatch

TRL models tend to disregard negative and obsolescence factors. There have been suggestions made for incorporating such factors into assessments.

For development of open-source hardware, Open Source Technology Readiness Levels (OSTRLs), is a relatively new readiness assessment framework for evaluating the openness maturity of technologies to be integrated into open source ecosystems built on top of the traditional TRL.

For complex technologies that incorporate various development stages, a more detailed scheme called the Technology Readiness Pathway Matrix has been developed going from basic units to applications in society. This tool aims to show that a readiness level of a technology is based on a less linear process but on a more complex pathway through its application in society.

== History ==
Technology readiness levels were conceived at NASA in 1974 and formally defined in 1989. The original definition included seven levels, but in the 1990s NASA adopted the nine-level scale that subsequently gained widespread acceptance.

Original NASA TRL Definitions (1989)

Level 1 – Basic Principles Observed and Reported
Level 2 – Potential Application Validated
Level 3 – Proof-of-Concept Demonstrated, Analytically and/or Experimentally
Level 4 – Component and/or Breadboard Laboratory Validated
Level 5 – Component and/or Breadboard Validated in Simulated or Realspace Environment
Level 6 – System Adequacy Validated in Simulated Environment
Level 7 – System Adequacy Validated in Space

The TRL methodology was originated by Stan Sadin at NASA Headquarters in 1974. Ray Chase was then the NASA Jet Propulsion Laboratory (JPL) Propulsion Division representative on the Jupiter Orbiter design team. At the suggestion of Stan Sadin, Chase used this methodology to assess the technology readiness of the proposed JPL Jupiter Orbiter spacecraft design. Later Chase spent a year at NASA Headquarters helping Sadin institutionalize the TRL methodology. Chase joined ANSER in 1978, where he used the TRL methodology to evaluate the technology readiness of proposed US Air Force development programs. He published several articles during the 1980s and 1990s on reusable launch vehicles using the TRL methodology.

These documented an expanded version of the methodology that included design tools, test facilities, and manufacturing readiness on the Air Force Have Not program. The Have Not program manager, Greg Jenkins, and Ray Chase published the expanded version of the TRL methodology, which included design and manufacturing. Leon McKinney and Chase used the expanded version to assess the technology readiness of the ANSER team's Highly Reusable Space Transportation (HRST) concept. ANSER also created an adapted version of the TRL methodology for proposed Homeland Security Agency programs.

The United States Air Force adopted the use of technology readiness levels in the 1990s.

In 1995, John C. Mankins, NASA, wrote a paper that discussed NASA's use of TRL, extended the scale, and proposed expanded descriptions for each TRL. In 1999, the United States General Accounting Office produced an influential report that examined the differences in technology transition between the US Department of Defense (DOD) and private industry. It concluded that the DOD takes greater risks and attempts to transition emerging technologies at lesser degrees of maturity than does private industry. The US Government Accountability Office (GAO) concluded that use of immature technology increased overall program risk. The GAO recommended that the DOD make wider use of technology readiness levels as a means of assessing technology maturity prior to transition.

In 2001, the US Deputy Under Secretary of Defense for Science and Technology issued a memorandum that endorsed use of TRLs in new major programs. Guidance for assessing technology maturity was incorporated into the Defense Acquisition Guidebook. Subsequently, the DOD developed detailed guidance for using TRLs in the 2003 DOD Technology Readiness Assessment Deskbook.

Because of their relevance to Habitation, 'Habitation Readiness Levels (HRL)' were formed by a group of NASA engineers (Jan Connolly, Kathy Daues, Robert Howard, and Larry Toups). They have been created to address habitability requirements and design aspects in correlation with already established and widely used standards by different agencies, including NASA TRLs.

More recently, Dr. Ali Abbas, Professor of chemical engineering and Associate Dean of Research at the University of Sydney and Dr. Mobin Nomvar, a chemical engineer and commercialisation specialist, have developed Commercial Readiness Level (CRL), a nine-point scale to be synchronised with TRL as part of a critical innovation path to rapidly assess and refine innovation projects to ensure market adoption and avoid failure.

=== In the European Union ===
The European Space Agency (ESA) adopted the Technology Readiness Level scale in the mid-2000s. Its handbook closely follows the NASA definitions of the TRLs. In 2022, ESA released a public TRL Calculator designed to support consistent assessment of space equipment and instruments (covering TRL 3 to TRL 7).

Wider use of the TRL scale in EU policy was proposed in the final report of the first High Level Expert Group on Key Enabling Technologies (2011). It was subsequently implemented in the EU's research and innovation framework programme Horizon 2020 (2014–2020) and retained in the successor programme Horizon Europe. As a result, TRLs are now applied across a wide range of domains beyond space and defence, including nanotechnology, information and communication technologies, energy, and health.

In Horizon Europe, TRLs are frequently used as eligibility and evaluation criteria. For example, Research and Innovation Actions (RIA) typically target lower-to-mid TRLs, while Innovation Actions (IA) focus on higher TRLs. Specific instruments under the European Innovation Council (EIC) also map to different TRL ranges (Pathfinder for early stages, Transition for mid-stages, and Accelerator for later stages).

== "Valley of Death" ==
New technologies often fail to make it from TRL 5 to TRL 7; thus, these levels are popularly referred to as the "Valley of Death" for new technologies. This typically results from the necessity of significant industry investment to be able to validate the technology in-situ, while not all relevant challenges are resolved; it also can be related to the differing motivations involved in industry funding of academic research. Other challenges present at these readiness levels include unwillingness to adopt technologies (e.g. for government contracts) and bureaucracy. Significant research effort has been devoted to supporting more technologies and research groups in bridging this gap.

== See also ==
- Capability Maturity Model Integration – Process level improvement training and appraisal program
- List of emerging technologies – New technologies actively in development
- Manufacturing readiness level – Method for estimating the maturity of manufacturing
- Open innovation – Term for external cooperation in innovation
- Technology assessment – Determining the value of a new technology
- Technology life cycle – Development, ascent, maturity, and decline of new technologies
- Technology transfer – Process of disseminating technology
