= Stefan Thomke =

Stefan Thomke is the William Barclay Harding Professor of Business Administration at Harvard Business School. He has worked with global business leaders and taught many executive programs on product, process, and technology development, customer experience design, operational improvement, company turnarounds, and innovation strategy. He is currently the faculty chair of the General Management and Managing Innovation executive education programs at Harvard Business School. Previously, Thomke was faculty chair of the MBA Required Curriculum and faculty co-chair of the doctoral program in Science, Technology and Management. He was also faculty chair of HBS executive education and research in South Asia.

Thomke joined the Technology and Operations Management unit at Harvard Business School in 1995, on completion of his doctoral studies in electrical engineering and management at MIT. Eric von Hippel was his doctoral advisor. Thomke's research and publications have focused primarily on the process, economics, and management of business experimentation, innovation, and product development. His work has shown how advances in experimentation have fundamentally changed how new products, technologies, customer experiences, and business models are created.

Thomke's highly cited research has been published as research articles, case studies and notes extensively in books and leading journals such as California Management Review, Harvard Business Review, Journal of Product Innovation Management, Management Science, Organization Science, Research Policy, MIT Sloan Management Review, Strategic Management Journal and Scientific American.

He is also author of the books Experimentation Matters: Unlocking the Potential of New Technologies for Innovation (Harvard Business School Press, 2003), Managing Product and Service Development (McGraw-Hill/Irwin, 2006), and Experimentation Works: The Surprising Power of Business Experiments (Harvard Business Review Press, 2020). Experimentation Works was selected as one of the ten best business and technology books in 2020 by Inc Magazine and Forbes. In 2012, Thomke received the Apgar Award for innovation in teaching. His Harvard Business Review article The Discipline of Business Experimentation (2014, with Jim Manzi) was runner-up for the 2014 HBR McKinsey Award.

Thomke grew up and completed his Abitur in Calw, Germany. Before joining Harvard Business School, he worked at McKinsey & Company, The Institute for Microelectronics Stuttgart, and Hewlett Packard Medical. Thomke is trained as an electrical engineer (undergraduate and graduate education).

== Degrees ==
- Technical University Graz, Doctorate (honorary), 2022
- HHL Leipzig Graduate School of Management, Doctorate in Economics (honorary), 2015
- Harvard University, Master of Arts (honorary), 2003
- Massachusetts Institute of Technology, PhD in Electrical Engineering & Management, 1995
- Massachusetts Institute of Technology, SM in Management, 1993
- Massachusetts Institute of Technology, SM in Operations Research, 1993
- Arizona State University, M.S. in electrical engineering, 1990
- University of Oklahoma, B.S. in electrical engineering, 1988
- Technical Gymnasium Calw, Abitur, 1984
