= Empathic design =

Product design theory

Empathic design is a user-centered design approach that pays attention to the user's feelings toward a product. The empathic design process is sometimes mistakenly referred to as empathetic design.

== Characteristics ==
The foundation of empathic design is observation and the goal to identify latent customer needs in order to create products that the customers don't even know they desire, or, in some cases, solutions that customers have difficulty envisioning due to lack of familiarity with the possibilities offered by new technologies or because they are locked in a specific mindset. Empathic design relies on observation of consumers as opposed to traditional market research which relies on consumer inquiry with the intention to avoid possible biases in surveys and questions, and minimizes the chance that consumers will provide false information.

Observations are carried out by a small team of specialists, such as an engineer, a human-factors expert, and a designer. Each specialist then documents their observations and the session is videoed to capture subtle interactions such as body language and facial expressions.

Learning users' unarticulated needs through a process of keen observation and interpretation can lead to breakthrough designs. Deszca et al. argue that market forces and competitive pressures in a fast-paced world are augmenting the importance of product innovation as a source of competitive advantage. They argue that in empathic design techniques, users are almost as involved in product design as designers and engineers. Therefore, such techniques can achieve new designs in potentially shorter product development cycles. To achieve this, they caution that observation group should consist of several others than simply designers and engineers, including trained anthropologists and/or ethnographers.

Von Hippel's research supports the theory that customers or users themselves are the source of much innovation. Empathic design using field observation can reveal opportunities to commercialize innovations existing users have already developed to improve products.

== Process ==
Leonard and Rayport identify the five key steps in empathic design as:

1. Observation
2. Capturing Data
3. Reflection and Analysis
4. Brainstorming for solutions
5. Developing prototypes of possible solutions

Prototypes, simulation and role-playing are other forms of learning processes, typically used to gather customer feedback to designs that have been developed based on empathic design.

One of the practitioners of empathic design is design company IDEO. IDEO believes that "seeing and hearing things with your own eyes and ears is a critical first step in creating a breakthrough product" IDEO refers to this as "human factors" or "human inspiration" and states that "Innovation starts with an eye", and once they start observing carefully, all kinds of insights and opportunities can pop up. IDEO include empathic design in their projects and list the key steps to their method as:

- Understand the market, client, technology and perceived constraints.
- Observe people in real-life situations to find out what motivates them, what confuses them, what they like, hate, where they have latent needs not addressed by current products and services.
- Visualize concepts that are new to the world
- Evaluate and refine the prototype
- Implement the new concept for commercialization.

The empathic model is a technique used to simulate age-related sensory losses to give designers personal experience with how their product performs for users. An example is how designers of a retirement community used empathy tools, such as glasses which reduced their vision and gloves which limited their grip and strength. Suri et al. reported another method of empathic design, involving designers shadowing vision-impaired users. The designer was then required to utilize non-visual cues to learn about a product by working in a dark environment.

Since its introduction, empathic design techniques for new products were first adopted by automotive and electronic product manufacturing industry. However, the techniques have been successfully used by several other organizations for designing innovative products. While the five steps mentioned above are at the foundation of empathic design process, several other techniques are used in combination with these five steps.

A study performed on UK based textile fiber manufacturer, Tencel Limited, by Lofthouse et al., shows that use of the Kano model in combination with the first step of user observation has led to understanding of new insights into how customers really perceived Tencel's fiber, and enabled the product development team to 'walk in the shoes' of the end user. The Kano model offered some insight into which product attributes were perceived to be important to customers. The questionnaires used to seek information from users, an important part of Kano model, were used in multiple focus groups consisting of target customers and multidisciplinary design teams. These focus groups carried the process into next three steps of capturing data, reflection and analysis, and brainstorming. In doing so they developed a so-called "journey diagram" to record activities that these groups identified to be necessary to move the project towards its final target.

Jääsko and Mattelmäki have studied user-centered design techniques such as empathic design by means of case studies in which they found extensive use of empathic design techniques when developing innovative patient monitoring instruments in hospitals by Datex-Ohmeda division of Instrumentarium Corporation. Datex-Ohmeda used a new technique called "probing" in combination with observation for gathering instrumental, visual and empathic data from "sensitive settings" – that is, situations and places where design team had no access or the access was only temporary. The probing process consisted of diaries, cameras, and illustrated cards with open questions and tasks for documenting routines, actions, and needs in different use situations.

Brandt and Grunnet have studied the use of drama and props as tools in empathic design process to collaboratively generate and explore innovative design ideas. They argue that use of drama and props may aid in engaging users more directly in the design process, especially during the prototype simulation step.

== Examples in practice ==
The following examples demonstrate cases where empathic design was applied to the new product development process successfully.

- Design Continuum of Milan, Italy, designed a series of baby bottles by using empathic design techniques where a team of designers collected data on user needs by observing kids in kindergartens and immersing themselves in the homes of some first-time mothers.
- The Instrumentarian Corporation’s Datex-Ohmeda division used empathic design (including the use of user diaries, cameras, and short-term observation in critical situations) to assist in the improvement of products provided to nurses in the health care industry.
- Polar Electro Oy, a manufacturer of heart rate monitors, used empathic design principles to observe and record user interactions with their product. The resulting data was fed back into the design organization to influence future designs and product development.
- Tencel LTD, a textile manufacturer in the United Kingdom, used empathic design techniques to solicit feedback on their current product line, understand positive and negative traits, and determine areas for immediate improvement.
- IDEO, Inc., a broad-based design services company, is well known for its employment of empathic design and brainstorming as its principal design methodology. Most products designed by IDEO incorporate some features based on the results of an empathic design experience.

== See also ==
- Contextual design
- Design thinking
- Ethnography
- Kano model
- Whole product
