= Whole product =

Concept in marketing

In marketing, the whole product concept is the third iteration of a model originally developed by Philip Kotler, a professor at the Kellogg School of Management at Northwestern University.

In his book entitled “Marketing Management” Kotler drew attention to the fact that consumers purchase more than the core product itself. And understanding the perception of value from the customer’s point of view, can help salespeople meet customer expectations.

Kotler’s Five Product Levels Model outlines a hierarchy of product features, starting with the core product and progressing through expected features, augmented features, and potential future enhancements.

Following the insights provided by Philip Kotler, Ted Levitt, a professor at Harvard Business School, elaborated on the fact that consumers purchase more than core features and functions. Rather, they purchase the core product combined with complimentary attributes, the majority of which are intangible.

The total product was Levitt’s vision of how intangible elements could be added to a physical product, transforming it into an offering that was often more valuable than the physical attributes alone.

The total product concept was also refined by Tom Peters. In a 1986 publication entitled "The Eye of the Beholder", Peters proposed an extension to Levitt’s total product concept that describes the discrepancy between insider and customer perceptions in three different types of industries.

Following the insights provided by Philip Kotler, Ted Levitt and later Tom Peters, Regis McKenna renamed the total product concept, calling it the "whole product" which he defined as a generic or core product, augmented by everything that is needed for the customer to have a compelling reason to buy.

A fourth iteration has been suggested by Warren Schirtzinger called the Low Risk Recipe. Schirtzinger organizes intangible product attributes into three groups that surround the core innovation, and act to lower the end user's perception of risk and encourage the adoption of a new innovation;

- End User Harmony - "closeness and understanding that allows the supplier to see the world from the customer’s point of view, and create a product that fits them so well, that it sells itself."
- Reliability and Commitment - "the supplier performs consistently well and in a trustworthy manner, which demonstrates the characteristics of an ideal partner with the required domain expertise"
- Safety in Numbers - "an independent ecosystem that increases the buyer’s confidence, provides unbiased support and reduces the perception of risk"

Working together with Warren Schirtzinger, Jose Bermejo suggested new intangible attributes that apply specifically to software products. Jose's angle sees the intangible elements of the Schirtzinger's Low Risk Reinvention as a way to build a brand beyond a core product and named his refined approach for software-based products The Brand Development Wheel™. He also separates the tangible dimensions of product and technology to differentiate what is required by innovators versus what is required by early adopters.

== See also ==
- Marketing
- Empathic design
- Product (business)
- Crossing the Chasm
