= User innovation =

Revolutional resource

User innovation refers to innovation by intermediate users (e.g. user firms) or consumer users (individual end-users or user communities), rather than by suppliers (producers or manufacturers). This is a concept closely aligned to co-design and co-creation, and has been proven to result in more innovative solutions than traditional consultation methodologies.

Eric von Hippel and others observed that many products and services are actually developed or at least refined, by users, at the site of implementation and use. These ideas are then moved back into the supply network. This is because products are developed to meet the widest possible need; when individual users face problems that the majority of consumers do not, they have no choice but to develop their own modifications to existing products, or entirely new products, to solve their issues. Often, user innovators will share their ideas with manufacturers in hopes of having them produce the product, a process called free revealing. However, user innovators also generate their own firms to commercialize their innovations and generate new markets, a process called "consumer-led market emergence." For example, research on how users innovated in multiple boardsports shows that some users capitalized on their innovations, founding firms in sports that became global markets.

Based on research on the evolution of Internet technologies and open source software Ilkka Tuomi (Tuomi 2002) further highlighted the point that users are fundamentally social. User innovation, therefore, is also socially and socio-technically distributed innovation. According to Tuomi, key uses are often unintended uses invented by user communities that reinterpret and reinvent the meaning of emerging technological opportunities.

The existence of user innovation, for example, by users of industrial robots, rather than the manufacturers of robots (Fleck 1988) is a core part of the argument against the Linear Innovation Model, i.e. innovation comes from research and development, is then marketed and 'diffuses' to end-users. Instead innovation is a non-linear process involving innovations at all stages.

== History ==
In 1986 Eric von Hippel introduced the lead user method that can be used to systematically learn about user innovation in order to apply it in new product development. In 2007 another specific type of user innovator, the creative consumer was introduced. These are consumers who adapt, modify, or transform a proprietary offering as opposed to creating completely new products.

User innovation has a number of degrees: innovation of use, innovation in services, innovation in configuration of technologies, and finally the innovation of novel technologies themselves. While most user innovation is concentrated in use and configuration of existing products and technologies, and is a normal part of long term innovation, new technologies that are easier for end-users to change and innovate with, and new channels of communication are making it much easier for user innovation to occur and have an impact.

Recent research has focused on Web-based forums that facilitate user (or customer) innovation - referred to as virtual customer environment, these forums help companies partner with their customers in various phases of product development as well as in other value creation activities. For example, Threadless, a T-shirt manufacturing company, relies on the contribution of online community members in the design process. The community includes a group of volunteer designers who submit designs and vote on the designs of others. In addition to free exposure, designers are provided monetary incentives including a $2,500 base award as well as a percentage of T-shirt sales. These incentives allow Threadless to encourage continual user contribution.

== See also ==
- Creativity techniques
- Crowdsourcing
- Domestication theory
- Ideas bank
- List of emerging technologies
- Open-design movement
- Participatory design
- Professional amateurs
- Prosumer
- Science and technology studies
- Toolkits for User Innovation

== Sources ==
- Bilgram, Volker; Brem, Alexander; Voigt, Kai-Ingo (September 2008). "USER-CENTRIC INNOVATIONS IN NEW PRODUCT DEVELOPMENT — SYSTEMATIC IDENTIFICATION OF LEAD USERS HARNESSING INTERACTIVE AND COLLABORATIVE ONLINE-TOOLS". International Journal of Innovation Management. 12 (3): 419–458. doi:10.1142/S1363919608002096.
- Bogers, Marcel; Afuah, Allan; Bastian, Bettina (July 2010). "Users as Innovators: A Review, Critique, and Future Research Directions". Journal of Management. 36 (4): 857–875. doi:10.1177/0149206309353944.
- Braun, Viktor R.G. (2007): Barriers to user-innovation & the paradigm of licensing to innovate, Doctoral dissertation: Hamburg University of Technology
- Fleck, James (1988), "Innofusion or Diffusation? The nature of technological development in robotics", Edinburgh PICT Working Paper No. 7
- Nambisan, Satish; Nambisan, Priya (2008), "How to Profit from a better Virtual Customer Environment", MIT Sloan Management Review: 53–61
- Tuomi, Ilkka (2002), Networks of Innovation, Oxford University Press, ISBN 978-0-19-925698-3
- von Hippel, Eric (2005), Democratizing Innovation, MIT Press
- von Hippel, Eric (July 1986). "Lead Users: A Source of Novel Product Concepts". Management Science. 32 (7): 791–805. doi:10.1287/mnsc.32.7.791.
- Williams, Robin; Edge, David (September 1996). "The social shaping of technology". Research Policy. 25 (6): 865–899. doi:10.1016/0048-7333(96)00885-2.
- Faulkner, Philip; Runde, Jochen (July 2009). "On the Identity of Technological Objects and User Innovations in Function". Academy of Management Review. 34 (3): 442–462. doi:10.5465/amr.2009.40632318.
