= Crossing the Chasm =

1991 marketing book by Geoffrey A. Moore

Crossing the Chasm: Marketing and Selling High-Tech Products to Mainstream Customers
- Book cover
- Author: Geoffrey A. Moore
- Language: English
- Subject: Marketing high-tech products
- Genre: Non-fiction
- Publisher: Harper Business Essentials
- Publication date: 1991
- Publication place: United States
- English publication date: 1991
- Media type: Book
- Pages: 227
- ISBN: 0-06-051712-3
- OCLC: 50470628

Crossing the Chasm: Marketing and Selling High-Tech Products to Mainstream Customers or simply Crossing the Chasm (1991, revised 1999 and 2014), is a marketing book by Geoffrey A. Moore that examines the market dynamics faced by innovative new products, with a particular focus on the "chasm" or adoption gap that lies between early and mainstream markets.

The book offers decision-making guidelines for investors, engineers, enterprise executives, marketers and managers throughout the high-tech community. Real-world examples of companies that have struggled in the chasm are also provided.

== Synopsis ==
"A compelling use case that will create pull, a whole product that nails the use case, and a word-of-mouth community that can communicate and reinforce the marketing message."

— Geoffrey Moore on the three dependencies for 'crossing the chasm'.

Crossing the Chasm is an adaptation of an innovation-adoption model called diffusion of innovations theory created by Everett Rogers, The author argues there is a chasm between the early adopters of the product (the technology enthusiasts and visionaries) and the early majority (the pragmatists). Moore believes visionaries and pragmatists have very different expectations, and he attempts to explore those differences and suggest techniques to successfully cross the "chasm," including choosing a target market, understanding the whole product concept, positioning the product, building a marketing strategy, choosing the most appropriate distribution channel and pricing.

According to Moore, anyone with an innovation or new product should focus on one group of customers at a time, using each group as a base for marketing to the next group. The most difficult step is making the transition between visionaries (early adopters) and pragmatists (early majority). This is the chasm that he refers to. If a successful firm can create a bandwagon effect in which enough momentum builds, then the product becomes a de facto standard, by creating a complete solution for one intractable problem in one business vertical before building out services in adjacent verticals and expanding on from there.

The 5 groups of customers as per "Crossing the Chasm" book

== Chasm concept formation ==
A 4-year "concept formation study" conducted by the Diffusion Research Institute (DRI) and published in 2021, documents the origin of the chasm concept, beginning with its creation at Regis McKenna Inc. in the Pacific Northwest.

The DRI study concluded the fundamental theories in Crossing the Chasm, including the concept of a gap or chasm between the early adopters of a product and the mainstream early majority, were developed in the late 1980s by Lee James and Warren Schirtzinger, consulting professionals working at Regis McKenna, Inc.

=== The pre-chasm concept ===
The concept of the "pre-chasm" in technology entrepreneurship describes the phase prior to the "chasm" in Crossing the Chasm; in pre-chasm thinking, the focus is on the specifics of marketing high-tech products during the early start-up period. The pre-chasm concept was suggested as an extension to Moore's model, arguing that the phase prior to the "chasm" is left unintended and that it, driven by technology commoditization and lean startup principles, requires an ambidextrous approach to product development alongside marketing to achieve product-market fit.

== Legacy and reception ==
Moore and his publisher originally thought that the book would sell around 5,000 copies. By 2002, ten years after the first publication, more than 300,000 copies had been sold. The third edition, released in 2014, is advertised by its publisher as having more than 1 million copies sold. Moore attributes this to word-of-mouth marketing, resonating initially with high-tech managers, then to engineers, venture capitalists and finally business schools.

In 2006, Tom Byers, director of the Stanford Technology Ventures Program, described it as "still the bible for entrepreneurial marketing 15 years later". The book's success has led to a series of follow-up books including Inside the Tornado, Living on the Fault Line, The Chasm Companion and a consulting company, The Chasm Group.

In 2013 Inc. Magazine identified the book as one of the top 10 marketing books of all time.

Everett Rogers, creator of diffusion of innovations, challenged the chasm concept saying:

Past research shows no support for this claim of a chasm between certain adopter categories. On the contrary, innovativeness, if measured properly, is a continuous variable and there are no sharp breaks or discontinuities between adjacent adopter categories (although there are important differences between them)".

== Related concepts ==
Crossing the Chasm is a variant of to the technology adoption lifecycle where five main segments are recognized: innovators, early adopters, early majority, late majority and laggards.

Moore's theories are only applicable for novel or discontinuous innovations in a B2B marketplace; adoption of continuous innovations — ones that do not force a significant change of behavior by the customer — are still best described by the original technology adoption lifecycle.

== See also ==
- Product life cycle management
