= Bucketfeet =

American online footwear retailer

Bucketfeet, Inc.
- Company type: Subsidiary
- Industry: Retail
- Founded: 2011
- Headquarters: Chicago, Illinois, U.S.
- Area served: Worldwide
- Key people: Raaja Nemani (CEO / Founder); Aaron Firestein (Chief Artist / Founder); Bobby Stephens (President & COO / Co-Founder)
- Products: Shoes, apparel
- Parent: Threadless
- Website: bucketfeet.com

Bucketfeet is an American online retailer specializing in artist-designed footwear. The company collaborates with a global community of artists to design limited-edition shoes with the goal of "sparking meaningful conversations to create a brighter world."

== Company history ==
Raaja Nemani and Aaron Firestein first met in 2008. The two became friends and upon Raaja's departure from Buenos Aires, Aaron sold him a pair of shoes on which he had drawn an artistic design. Raaja continued his year-long journey and cites the shoes as an easy conversation starter; he says people from all over the world would comment on their unique design and that several friendships were sparked from these initial conversations.

Aaron had been drawing on canvas sneakers since his college years. His designs had garnered the attention of his classmates, who began offering to buy his hand-designed shoes. Aaron's friends at the University of Oregon had nicknamed him "Bucket," so he began calling his creations "Bucketfeet." This was the inspiration for the name of the company he founded with Raaja Nemani years later.

After Raaja had completed his travels, he sent Aaron a Facebook message asking if he would be willing to move to Chicago and create a business around the idea of artist-designed sneakers. Aaron agreed, and the two moved to Chicago in 2010 and officially launched the business in 2011.

In 2012, Raaja and Aaron tapped Bobby Stephens, a seasoned Retail executive and fellow sneaker enthusiast, to round out the team. Shortly thereafter, Bucketfeet secured a significant fundraising round, including backing from Hydra Ventures (adidas).

In October 2017, Bucketfeet was acquired by online artist community and e-commerce retailer Threadless for an undisclosed amount.

== Business Model ==
Bucketfeet's business model is based on the premise that a different artist designs every shoe. Bucketfeet states its mission is to connect people around the world through art and the company collaborates with painters, designers, illustrators, and more to create each shoe design. The business aims to grant the emerging artists in its network exposure on a global scale. Bucketfeet purchases each artists' work upfront, and also pays a royalty for each shoe sold back to the artist who originally designed them.

Bucketfeet sells shoes through their online store, independent boutiques, and several brick-and-mortar locations. As of 2015, Bucketfeet had retail studio locations in downtown Chicago, Washington D.C, and New York City. After being acquired by Threadless in 2017, Bucketfeet shuttered all retail stores, focusing on their core online business through the Threadless e-commerce website.
