= Elephant Design =

Design company in Pune, India

- Type: Private
- Industry: Design Firm, Consulting, Design Research, Innovation Strategy, Industrial Design, Interaction Design, Package Design, Retail Design, Branded Environments
- Founded: 1989
- Founder: Ashwini Deshpande, Partha Guha, Ashish Deshpande
- Area served: India, Japan, South East Asia, Middle East
- Key people: Anand Palsodkar, Design Director, Product Innovation Kedar Parundekar, General Manager, Business Development & Brand Strategy
- Owner: 5 Shareholders
- Website: http://www.elephantdesign.com/

Elephant Design Pvt. Ltd. is a Pune based strategic design & innovation consultancy, founded in 1989 by graduates from the National Institute of Design in India.

Elephant has offices in India & Singapore. A team of about 65 people who are presently led by three co-founder directors: Ashwini Deshpande, Partho Guha and Ashish Deshpande. Over the three decades Elephant has been in Design business, it has impacted some of India's most popular brands. The company represents India at the Design Alliance Asia as founding associates. Ashwini Deshpande is a part of the core group that steers the Design Alliance Consortium.

== History ==
=== 1983–1990: formative years ===
Elephant, was conceived on the staircase of the National Institute of Design campus, as a follow-up to a series of philosophical discussions following a 1988 Design Management module undertaken by the batch of 1983. In the events that ensued, a few from the batch got together to seriously put together a multi disciplinary design consulting firm on the Indian landscape at a time when design consulting practice was almost non-existent.

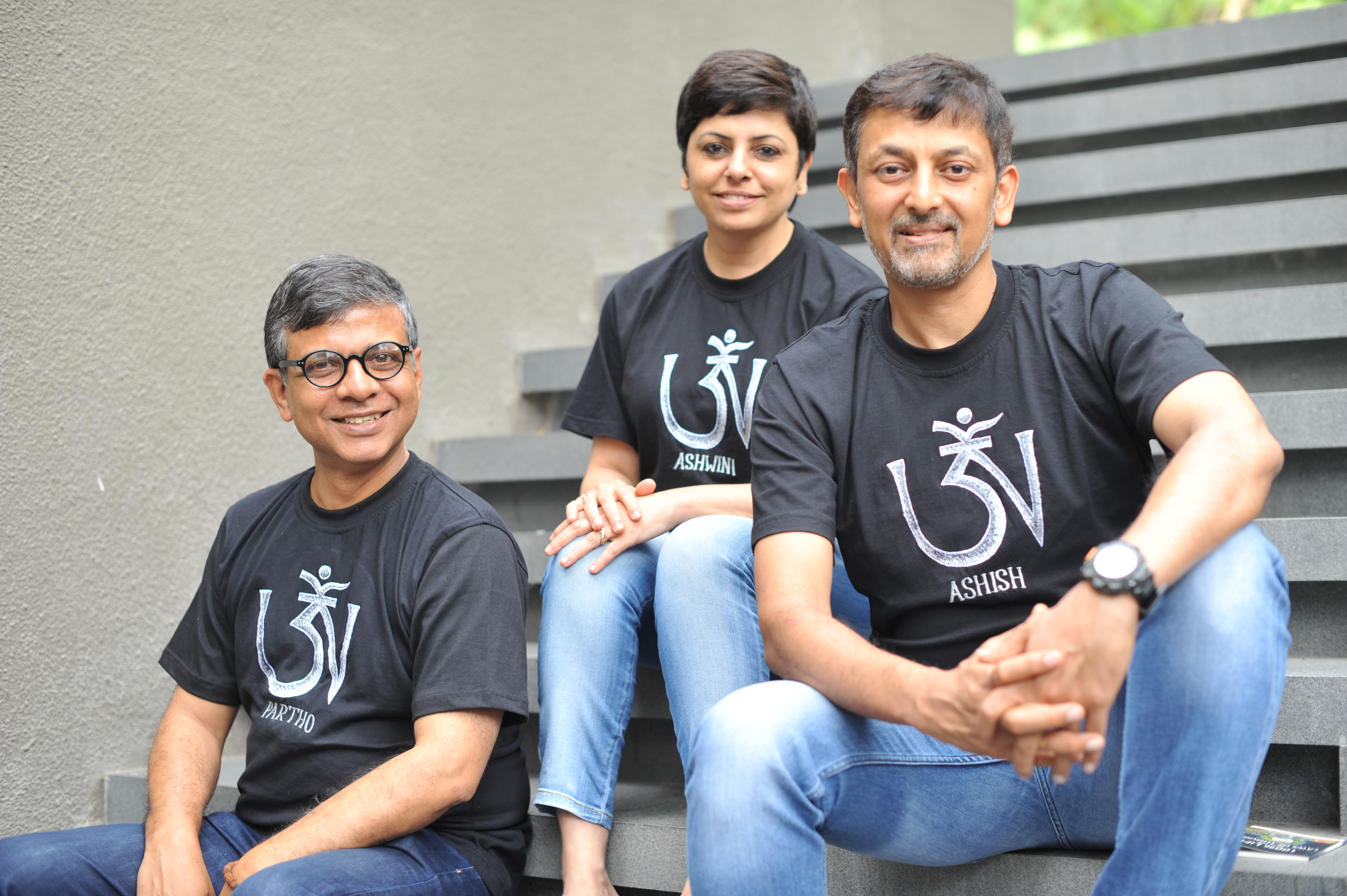
Elephant co-founders Partho Guha, Ashwini Deshpande and Ashish Deshpande

The group graduated from NID on 14 April 1989 and took an overnight bus to reach the city of Pune on 16 April 1989. Elephant began initial operations out of hostel trunks, largely thanks to generous help from several kind-hearted souls in Pune city, notable amongst them are Sandhya Potdar, Limaye & Bhamburkar families. Ashwini Deshpande, Partho Guha, Sudhir Sharma, Ashish Deshpande & Vineet Limaye were the first to reach Pune. Gargi Sharma (then Gargi Gupta, 1984 Batch) joined the team in Pune about a year later.

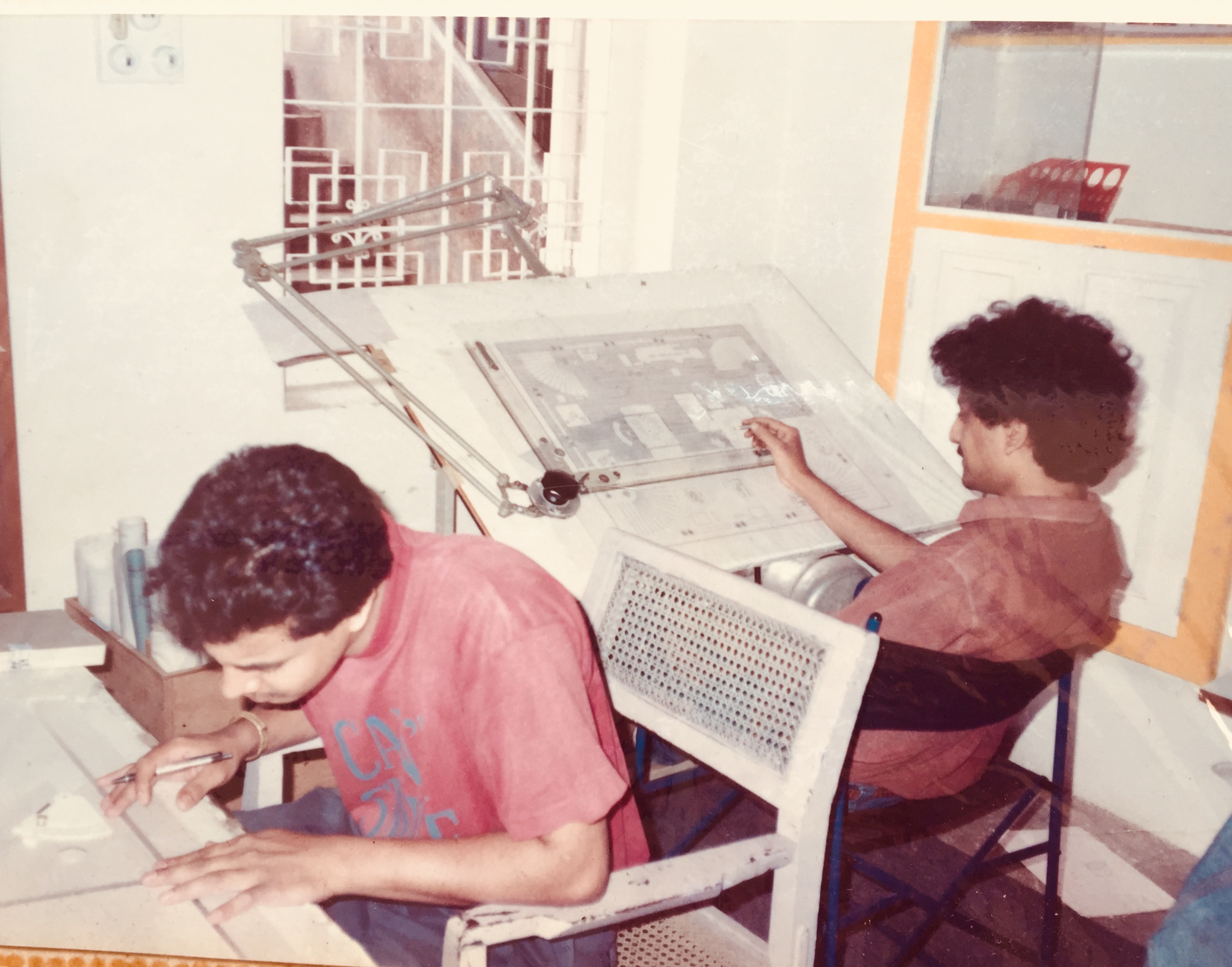
Elephant Design Old Office, Navi Peth 1990

Elephant was registered on 2 May 1989 and began operating from a 10 ft × 10 ft room, at 165, Shukrawar Peth, Pune. The space belonged to Ashwini Deshpande's parents (then Ashwini Oak), where stood her ancestral Oak Wada. Initial work revolved around corporate communications and exhibitions. The firm was registered as Elephant, The Design Office. The initial offering was multi disciplinary owing to the different design specialization of the founders. Vineet Limaye specialized in furniture design, Ashwini Deshpande, exhibitions, Sudhir Sharma, visual communication, Partha Guha had specialized in films, Ashish Deshpande, product design and Gargi Sharma, it was animation.

January, 1990, the team moved from the Shukrawar Peth office to Ganjve Chowk, Navi Peth where they remained till 1995. Initial years were exploratory, work was sporadic and there were many afternoons spent playing Scotland Yard. Some notable work was done during this period for BASF Ltd. Germany, Gurjari, Dr. Beck & Co. and H&FS Magazine.

=== 1991–2000: consolidation years ===
Vineet Limaye resigned from the firm in the year 1991–1992 to start his own practice. The first computer (ICIM 386 PC) was acquired at Elephant for CAD work which went obsolete within 6 months due to introduction of 486 PCs.

In 1994, the firm worked on the National Games’ signage system design. Elephant Design Pvt. Ltd., a private limited company was established in May, 1995. It was also the year, the company moved to its own premises at Pragati Complex, Kothrud Industrial Area, Pune.

=== 2001–2010: leadership years ===
Several notable trade fair pavilions were designed during this period for Bajaj Auto, Kalyani Group, TCS, DRDO, Maruti Suzuki and Thermax Ltd. Retail Merchandising standards were defined for Standard Chartered Bank, several P&G Brands and Service Standards for Bajaj Auto. Gargi Sharma resigned from Elephant in 2003. 2004 saw Elephant work on a major identity revamp for Bajaj Auto.

This phase saw Elephant adding strategic value to projects and client businesses. Trade Mark Elephant Design was registered to reinforce the consulting offering. Bajaj Probiking stores, aligning different business brands with the new mother brand for Godrej Group along with visual language, award-winning Suzlon Global Headquarters Brand Experience, Nissan India Car Project, Venky's Rebrand Program, Britannia Visual Language and the Commonwealth Youth Games 2008 design program were notable projects during this period.

India's leading business publication, The Economic Times Brand Equity ranked Elephant amongst the top 5 design agencies in 2008.

Sudhir Sharma's working association with Elephant ended in 2009. The year of 2009-2010 was a difficult year, due to global recession and the Indian economy reflecting a steep nosedive.

By end of 2010, Elephant had expanded. An adjoining building was leased in Bavdhan, Pune to accommodate the growing team strength. Elephant invested in a Delhi-based communication agency, Brand Planet, thereby augmenting their operations in the Delhi area.

=== 2011–2018: transformative years ===
2011 saw Elephant foray into Singapore by forging association with Tandem Leap Pte. Ltd.

Internally, the team was streamlining its processes and employee structure. A detailed working program of Design Process was defined through internal workshops and Elephant shifted to a 5-day week working structure. This phase was devoted to articulating values at Elephant and aligning individual & institutional objectives to work. This period also saw, the leadership contributing extensively to thought leadership in Design, Design Thinking and Design Practice through lectures, talks, workshops, blogs and articles.

The decade saw some pointed work output at Elephant that provided strategic fillip to several businesses. The consulting team worked over retail design programs for CEAT Ltd., Sakaal Media Group's transformation, BharatBenz branding for Daimler Benz, almost the entire range of package design at Britannia and a new Retail program for Axis Bank.

Brand refresh and product design work done for Nirlep Industries won the Designomics Award. Elephant team worked on the “Colours of Asia” Project with the Design Alliance Asia contributing extensively to research and design for Exhibition, research papers & workshops on colour. Ashwini Deshpande edited the now seminal Asian document published on colour book, Colours of Asia. Work done for start up brand, Paperboat, went on to create product history with design helping the brand become one of top 10 buzziest brands in India by 2016.

In 2016, Elephant exited from Brand Planet and closed their Delhi office while continuing to work in the region.

== Influences ==
Early inspiration for the Design Consultancy is supposed to have stemmed from the German design firm Frog Design and the American Design firm, Pentagram. Later influences came from the Palo Alto design major IDEO, Boston based Continuum, and The Netherlands-based NPK Design.

With Continuum and NPK, the relationship was based on mentoring and sharing that helped Elephant evolve as a scaled-up consultancy model.

== Present work ==
Elephant Design provides integrated design solutions using Design Thinking to a multitude of Indian as well as International clients in a number of disciplines including; Product Development, Industrial Design, Package Design, User Experience, Design Strategy & Research, Brand Strategy, Retail Standards, Branded Spaces, Visual Communication and Digital Interaction Design.

== Teams ==
The firm employs over 65 people from Industrial Design, Visual Communication, Brand Strategy, Design Research, and Interaction Design, Mechanical Engineering & Manufacturing, Management and Interior Architects.

== Awards and recognition ==
Elephant Design has been named India's Number 1 Design Agency in (2014, 2017, 2018) in the Brand Equity Agency Reckoner published by The Economic Times, India. In 2018, they were awarded the Design House of the Year by Lexus India for their packaging work for PaperBoat's range of traditional drinks.

In the space of retail design, they won two consecutive VMRD awards for Best Retail Design for QSR chains Venky's Xprs & Krustys Bistro. Their long-time partnership with Axis Bank was instrumental in getting them the CMO Asia Award for Impactful Retail & Merchandising Program.

== Individual recognition and appointments ==
- Partho Guha, National Artist, Lalit Kala Akademi, 1996
- Ashish Deshpande, Member, 2nd India Design Council, 2013-2016
- Ashish Deshpande, President, Association of Designers of India, 2016-2018
- Ashish Deshpande, Product Design Jury, Cannes Lions, 2016
- Ashish Deshpande, Independent Director, Symphony Ltd., 2017-onwards
- Ashwini Deshpande, IMPACT 50 most influential women in media & advertising, 2014-2018
- Ashwini Deshpande, Spikes Asia Jury, Singapore, 2012
- Ashwini Deshpande, Graphic Design Jury, Cannes Lions, 2015
- Ashwini Deshpande, Design For Asia Jury, Hong Kong, 2018
- Ashwini Deshpande, The Young Guns Jury, New York, 2018
- Mayuri Nikumbh, Impact 40 under 40 achievers in media advertising, 2018

== Legacy and publications ==
Ashwini Deshpande writes a column about design in an Indian newspaper called Sakal
