= Virtual customer environment =

A Virtual Customer Environment (VCE) is a web forum to facilitate customer co-innovation or user innovation.

Customers can partner with companies in different phases of product (or service) innovation - in product ideation, in product design & development, in product testing, and in product diffusion. VCEs can be designed so as to facilitate these different customer co-innovation roles. Examples of customer co-innovation through VCEs include Microsoft and the MVP forum; Nokia and the Concept Lounge; Ducati and the Tech Cafe; etc.

The term 'Virtual Customer Environment' was introduced by Satish Nambisan of Rensselaer Polytechnic Institute.

Research published in MIT Sloan Management Review in 2008 focused on customer experience in such virtual customer environments and how companies can establish their VCEs so as to provide positive customer experiences in value co-creation.

Subsequent research extended the concept beyond new product development to include service and business-to-business contexts, and examined the effects of customer participation on innovation outcomes and firm performance.

== See also ==
- Ideas bank
- Crowdsourcing
- Innovation management
- Wisdom of crowds
