= Geoffrey Moore =

American organizational theorist, management consultant and author

Dr Geoffrey Alexander Moore
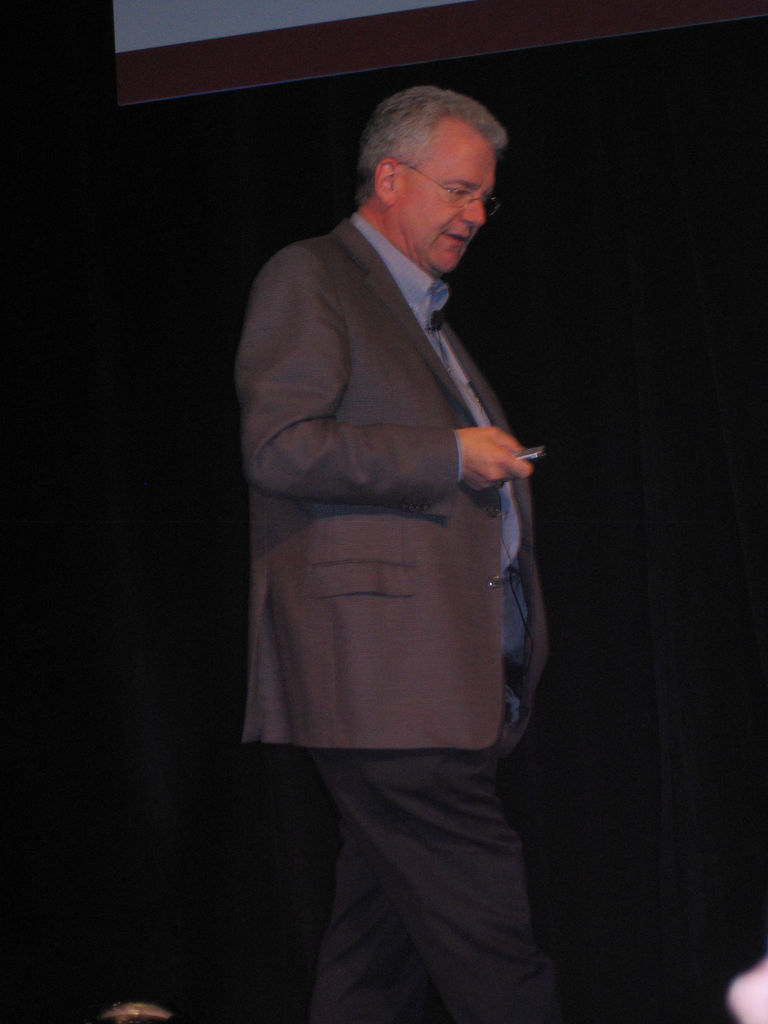
- Born: July 31, 1946 (age 79); Portland, Oregon, U.S.
- Occupation(s): Author, professional speaker, consultant, management expert
- Spouse: Marie Moore (m. 1968)

Geoffrey Moore (born 1946) is an American organizational theorist, management consultant and author, known for his work Crossing the Chasm: Marketing and Selling High-Tech Products to Mainstream Customers.

== Biography ==
Moore received a bachelor's degree in American literature from Stanford University (1967) and a doctorate in English literature from the University of Washington (1974).

Moore began his professional life as an English professor at Olivet College in Michigan. He later moved his family to California and accepted a position as a corporate trainer and executive assistant at a technology company.

Prior to working with the McKenna Group, Moore was a sales and marketing executive at Rand Information Systems, Enhansys, and Mitem. He heads his own consulting firm, Geoffrey Moore Consulting, and is a venture partner with Mohr Davidow Ventures and Wildcat Venture Partners as well as managing director at Geoffrey Moore Consulting.

== Books ==
- Crossing the Chasm: Marketing and Selling High-tech Products to Mainstream Customers (1991, revised 1999 and 2014). ISBN 0-06-051712-3
- Inside the Tornado: Marketing Strategies from Silicon Valley's Cutting Edge (1995). ISBN 9780887307652.
  - Inside the Tornado: Strategies for Developing, Leveraging, and Surviving Hypergrowth Markets (2004). Revised edition. ISBN 0-88730-824-4
- The Gorilla Game: An Investor's Guide to Picking Winners in High Technology (with Paul Johnson and Tom Kippola, 1998). ISBN 9780887308871.
  - The Gorilla Game : Picking Winners in High Technology (1999). Revised edition. ISBN 978-0887309571.
- Living on the Fault Line : Managing for Shareholder Value in the Age of the Internet (2000). ISBN 9780887308888.
  - Living on the Fault Line, Revised Edition: Managing for Shareholder Value in Any Economy (2002). Revised edition. ISBN 9780060086763.
- Dealing with Darwin: How Great Companies Innovate at Every Phase of Their Evolution (2005). ISBN 978-1591841074.
- Escape Velocity: Free Your Company's Future from the Pull of the Past (2011). ISBN 978-0062040893.
- Zone to Win: Organizing to Compete in an Age of Disruption (2015). ISBN 978-1682301715.
- The Infinite Staircase: What the Universe Tells Us About Life, Ethics, and Mortality (2021). ISBN 978-1950665983.
