= Threadless =

Online community of artists and clothing website

- Website type: Private
- Founded: 2000; 26 years ago
- Headquarters: 401 N. Morgan Chicago, United States
- Key people: Jake Nickell (founder, CEO); Jacob DeHart (founder, CTO 2000–2007); Tom Ryan (CEO, 2008–2012); Jeffrey Kalmikoff (CCO, 2003–2009); Harper Reed (Lead Engineer, 2005–2007; CTO, 2007–2009)
- Industry: Retail
- Products: Apparel/prints – phone cases, shoes, bags, notebooks, etc.
- Employees: 100
- Parent: SkinnyCorp LLC
- Website: www.threadless.com

Threadless (stylized as threadless) is an online community of artists and an e-commerce website based in Chicago, Illinois, founded in 2000 by Jake Nickell and Jacob DeHart.

Threadless designs are created by and chosen by an online community. Each week, about 1,000 designs are submitted online and are put to a public vote. After seven days the staff reviews the top-scoring designs. Based on the average score and community feedback, about 10 designs are selected each week, printed on clothing and other products, and sold worldwide through the online store and at their retail store in Chicago. Designers whose work is printed receive no cash but receive 20% royalties based on net profits paid on a monthly basis, as well as cash and Threadless merchandise.

== History of the company ==
Co-founders Jake Nickell and Jacob DeHart started Threadless in 2000 with $1,000. Threadless began as a T-shirt design competition on the now defunct dreamless.org, a forum where users experimented with computers, code, and art. Nickell and DeHart invited users to post their designs on a dreamless thread (hence the name Threadless), and they would print the best designs on T-shirts.

Shortly after the first batch of shirts was printed, the founders built a website for Threadless and introduced a voting system where designs could be scored 1 to 5. By 2002, Jake Nickell had quit his full-time job, dropped out of art school, and started his own web agency called skinnyCorp, with Threadless continuing to build under the skinnyCorp umbrella. The company moved from his apartment to a 900-square-foot (84 m^{2}) office.

A new batch of T-shirts was printed once the previous batch had sold out. In 2000, Threadless would print shirts every few months. By 2004, the company was printing new shirts every week. By 2004, Threadless was big enough that skinnyCorp did not need to continue outside client work. The company moved to a larger warehouse space. In 2004, profit was around $1.5 million, and in 2006 it jumped to $6.5 million.

In a 2006 Wired article, Jeff Howe coined the term crowdsourcing. Jeff Howe soon associated Threadless with crowdsourcing.

In 2008, Threadless was featured on the cover of Inc. as "The Most Innovative Small Company in America." Though Nickell did not disclose revenues for the article, Inc. estimated $30 million sales and a 30% profit margin. "Threadless completely blurs that line of who is a producer and who is a consumer," said Karim Lakhani, a professor at Harvard Business School who was quoted in the article. "The customers end up playing a critical role across all its operations: idea generation, marketing, sales forecasting. All that has been distributed."

In 2010, Abrams Image published Threadless: Ten Years of T-shirts from the World's Most Inspiring Online Design Community, written by Jake Nickell. The book features a decade of Threadless designs, interviews with many of the designers, and a year-by-year breakdown of how the company has grown and evolved.

The company's market strategy is called co-creation, allowing its customers to be the product developers or designers.

In October 2017, Threadless announced that they acquired Bucketfeet, a shoe company specializing in artist-designed footwear. Bucketfeet similarly produces on-demand products and has their own network of artists and its net worth was 50 million dollars. In 2018, Threadless will integrate Bucketfeet and their artists into its website.

In summer 2020, when face masks became more common due to COVID-19, Threadless started to sell masks with designs from its art community, stating that the portion of sales would go to a non-profit organization, MedShare.

== Features ==
- Voting system: Threadless allows users to vote on designs, and rate them on a scale from 1–5. Designs are scored by the community for one week before being reviewed by the Threadless staff. The staff chooses a number of the highest-scoring designs for the week and prints them.
- Design challenges: In order to curate designs centered around a topic, Threadless holds design challenges. In these challenges, users can gain an extra cash reward in addition to the normal cut of product sales. This allows Threadless to have some control over the products they produce, while still having the content come from the community. This builds customer satisfaction and gives credibility to the company as well as the products. In the past, Threadless has teamed up with several businesses, such as The Simpsons, to create officially licensed merchandise that is sold on the Threadless website.
- Forums: Threadless has forums for a variety of topics which include artist shops, tips and tricks, arts and design, and projects. The forums are focused on designers who want to get feedback on their designs, or ones who need help with the whole process.
- Artist Shops: These shops are independent of the Threadless store. Each artist has their own shop where they control the content and the pricing. Threadless charges a base price for making each item but allows the user to decide how much to charge above that amount for their products. It allows artists to sell their work, even if it is not selected for printing initially. It also allows Threadless to target niche markets similar to companies like Redbubble.
- Marketing strategy: Threadless uses the co-design type of co-creation, which enables the users to design the products and enhances the scope of consumers' powers.

== Printing techniques ==
=== Screen printing ===
Most Threadless T-shirts are not printed using the screen printing technique anymore. Plastisol or water-based inks are applied to the shirt through mesh screens which limits the areas where ink is deposited. Threadless printing techniques include gradients and simulated process, UV color change, oversized printing, puff, belt printing, vinyl, super glow, flock, embroidery, suede, metallic, blister, foil, and high density.

=== Direct-to-garment printing ===
In September 2011, Threadless announced Threadless Labs on its forum. Through Threadless Labs, the company will begin experimenting with new products and printing. The first Threadless Labs experiment is direct-to-garment (DTG) printing, a process of printing on textiles and garments using specialized or modified inkjet technology. Threadless now prints four new DTG T-shirts each week in addition to the week's 10 new screen-printed shirts.

== Artist compensation ==
Originally Threadless offered a $2,500 prize for artists that won a weekly design challenge. With the introduction of new terms and a shift in the company in 2014, the weekly design competition awarded a $250 gift code and artists retain all rights to their work and receive royalties on each sale. Threadless started Artist Shops in 2015, which allowed artists to sell T-shirts printed with any design directly to customers and receive royalties. Since the program rolled out in 2016 there have been over 100,000 Artist Shops. However, many artists feel that without the $2,500 prize for winning the weekly design competition, the incentive to use Threadless has decreased.

== Retail locations ==
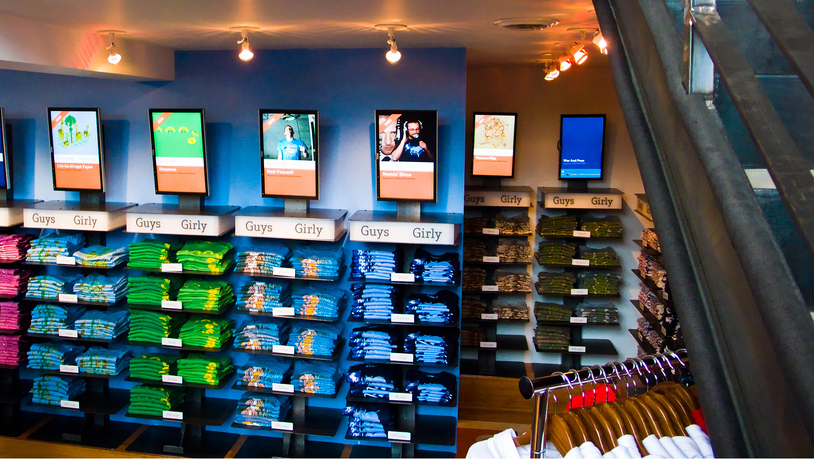
Threadless store in Chicago

In August 2007, Threadless announced the grand opening of a retail store. In January 2014, Threadless announced it had closed its 3011 N. Broadway St. location in Chicago because of a decline in sales.

== Book ==
In October 2010, Abrams publishers released a ten-year retrospective of Threadless T-shirt designs and the company's history.

== See also ==
- Direct to garment printing
- Screen printing
