= Eric von Hippel =

American economist (born 1941)

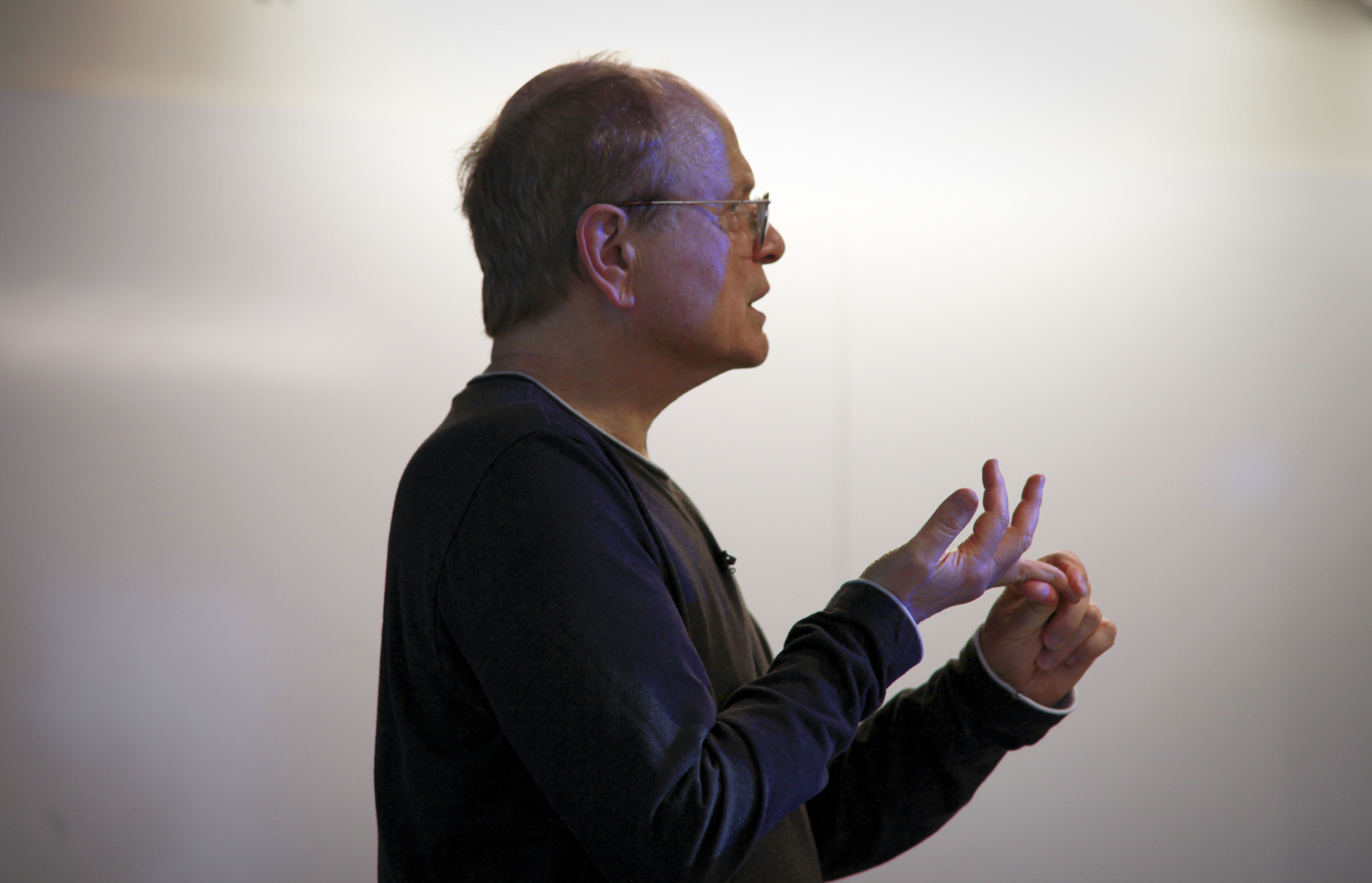
- Born: August 27, 1941 (age 85)
- Education: Harvard; MIT; Carnegie Mellon
- Known for: User innovation Lead user theory
- Scientific career
- Fields: Management, Innovation
- Workplaces: Massachusetts Institute of Technology
- Doctoral advisor: Dwight Baumann; Charles Kriebel; Milton Shaw; Edward B. Roberts
- Doctoral students: Dietmar Harhoff; Stefan Thomke; Karim Lakhani; Sonali Shah; Susumu Ogawa; Benjamin Mako Hill

Eric von Hippel (born August 27, 1941) is an American economist and a professor at the MIT Sloan School of Management, specializing in the nature and economics of distributed and open innovation. He is best known for his work in developing the concept of user innovation – that end-users, rather than manufacturers, are responsible for a large amount of innovation. In 1986 he coined the term lead user to describe this phenomenon.

Eric von Hippel is the son of the Arthur Robert von Hippel, a material scientist and physicist who was also a professor at MIT. His mother was Dagmar Franck von Hippel, a daughter of James Franck, a German physicist who won the 1925 Nobel Prize for Physics with Gustav Hertz "for their discovery of the laws governing the impact of an electron upon an atom." His great-uncle is the German ophthalmologist Eugen von Hippel.

von Hippel has been awarded the EU Innovation Luminary Award (2015), the Schumpeter School Prize (2017), and the Portugal Medal of Science (2020). He is a member of the advisory board of Patient Innovation, a nonprofit, international, multilingual, free venue for patients and caregivers of any disease to share their innovations.

== Early life ==
Eric von Hippel grew up in suburban Weston, MA with his parents, three brothers, and one sister. In his early years, Eric attended public school within the town, but then moved on to the Cambridge School of Weston – a private progressive school – for 8th grade, as well as his later years. Even as a young child, outside of the classroom, one of Eric's favorite pastimes was to try to create and invent new things. Much of his inspiration came from his father, Arthur Robert von Hippel, who was also a professor at MIT.

== Education ==
For his undergraduate degree, Eric von Hippel attended Harvard College. In an interview with Eric, he stated that he chose Harvard over MIT for the opportunity to pursue Liberal Arts. His decision to major in Economics came after he explored courses in Biology and History, and found that neither was particularly the right fit for him. After pursuing several inventions post undergraduate, Eric returned to school for his master's degree in Mechanical Engineering at MIT. From there, he went on to start his own company, worked at management consultant McKinsey and Co., and eventually studied at Carnegie Mellon University for his Ph.D. in Innovation.

=== Degrees ===
- University of Vaasa Ph.D. 2018 (Hon)
- Hamburg University of Technology Ph.D. 2013 (Hon)
- Copenhagen Business School Ph.D. 2007 (Hon)
- LMU Munich Ph.D. 2004 (Hon)
- Carnegie Mellon University Ph.D. 1974
- Massachusetts Institute of Technology S.M. 1966
- Harvard College B.A. 1964

== Major works ==
Von Hippel has published three books to date. All are published under Creative Commons licenses, and electronic copies can be obtained by anyone at no cost. These books are titled The Sources of Innovation (1988); (2) Democratizing Innovation (2005); and Free Innovation (2017).

Major topics covered in these books and also in many research articles follow.

=== Innovation by lead users ===
User innovation occurs when individuals or firms that actually use a product or service develop what they need for themselves. This is in contrast to producer innovation, where firms develop products for sale to users. Eric von Hippel was one of the first to explore this phenomenon in depth. He found that innovation by users differed from innovation by producers in a number of important ways. For example, products developed and sold by producers are typically intended to profitably serve the average needs of a wide range of people, and therefore may fit the needs of specific customers only approximately. In contrast, users develop or modify products to fit their own needs very precisely.

von Hippel coined the term "lead users" to describe innovating users with needs that are ahead of the general market. Lead users are a very important source of innovative progress because they often pioneer - acting earlier than producers to develop important new types of products and applications. Being innovation pioneers pays for lead users because they innovate only to serve their own needs. For this reason, they need not concern themselves with whether others will also want what they are developing for themselves. In contrast, producers must wait for evidence that there is a general and profitable market to be served before they can justify investing in a new type of innovation. For example, mountain bikes were developed by individuals who simply wanted to bike down mountains for fun, and so invented the sport of mountain biking for themselves. Bike producers stood by, simply watching and waiting for years until the extent of the market became clear. Finally, after the new sport had spread to hundreds of enthusiasts who participated by building their own "clunker" mountain bikes, producers finally entered the new market with the first commercial mountain bike products.

Studies of 1,678 innovations in nine industries find that lead users were the pioneering developers of 54.4% of those judged most important over time. User innovation activity appears to be present in all fields in which users have an interest, ranging from home cleaning equipment to medical devices. For example, a study of 500 patients with chronic diseases found that 8% of these individuals or their informal family caregivers had developed solutions that were both valuable to themselves, and novel to medical practice. Innovation development by users includes services as well as products. For example, in a study of the sources of important retail and commercial banking services, it was found that about half were first developed by users. Lead user innovation also is prominently present in "low-tech" as well as more technologically sophisticated fields

Lead user identification has become an important method used by companies to identify the newest user-developed innovations of potential interest to their customers. The method first developed for lead user identification, and still often used today, is called pyramiding. It centrally involves a systematic networking process in which a searcher sequentially contacts and interviews experts who may know of lead users who have developed valuable innovations. More recently, artificial intelligence methods have been developed to economically screen massive amounts of user-generated content posted on the internet to identify valuable user-developed innovations.

=== Free Citizen Innovation ===
Eric von Hippel and his colleagues have conducted a series of national surveys to identify the amount and importance of innovation being developed by consumers for their own use. These nationally representative surveys have been conducted in ten nations to date. An important, top-level finding from these studies is that the level of household sector innovation development by consumers, thought in Schumpeterian economics to be minimal, is in fact massive in scale. The fraction of citizens innovating for their own use ranges from 1.5% in China, to 5.2% in the US, to 9.6% in Russia. In aggregate across the 10 nations surveyed to date, 65 million citizen innovators - consumers - have been documented to be spending tens of billions of dollars per year to develop novel products for themselves. A second major finding is that more than 90% of the innovation developments by citizens are "free" - freely revealed by their citizen-developers to both peer consumers and commercializing producers without any intellectual property protections. Free citizen innovators are willing to openly reveal their innovation designs because they justify their development costs in terms of direct "self-rewards" they gain from innovating rather than from sales of their innovations to others. These self-rewards importantly include benefits from personal use of their innovations, plus the learning and enjoyment they gained by engaging in the innovation development process. The remaining 10% of household sector innovators are consumer-entrepreneurs. These individuals do hope to commercialize their innovations and so generally do not freely reveal their developments.

Further important findings from the ten national surveys include that the rate of citizen innovation is significantly positively correlated with both citizen education and citizen income. Also important to note is that user innovators develop different types of innovations than do producers. This has led to the observation that producers and users are enacting a division of labor in the innovation process not previously documented. It has been proposed that innovation policy should be adapted to take this into account.

The implications for national economies of large-scale citizen innovation in the household sector of national economies - "Household R&D" - has been explored only in the case of the US to date. Household R&D is the dedication of household resources to creating a product or process that will generate a service flow in the future. Sichel and von Hippel find that household investment in R&D in the US was more than 11 percent of R&D funded by the private business sector in 2017, and over half of what businesses spent on R&D to develop new products for consumers. If household R&D were judged to be in scope for GDP, US GDP would have been 0.2 percent higher in 2017. The authors conclude that household R&D is important and warrants much closer attention in future.

Citizen innovation, already shown to be important as was just described, is steadily becoming still more important relative to the producer-centered innovation process still focused on today in innovation theory. This is due to two technological trends. The first is the increasing availability of cheap or free digital design tools that can be used at home on ordinary personal computers that most consumers possess. These design tools have essentially closed the capability gap between developers working in specialist producer laboratories and designers working at home in most fields. (Consider that expert producer employee innovators all return to their households in the evening, bringing their training and expertise with them – and which they can now apply to design activities at home using state-of-the-art design tools.)

The second important trend is the radical reduction in communication costs enabled by the internet. It used to be that producers had critical scale advantages over household sector innovators. Producers, justified by expectations of selling copies of innovations to many, were able to dedicate a team of many designers to the development of a given design. In contrast householders, with no way to identify or share their work with potentially interested others, generally had to work alone, with investments justified by usage of a design by only one or a few. Today, a household sector innovator interested in developing a particular design can post his or her interest and idea and evolving design openly on the web. Those who have similar needs can then come forward, pick up a share of the work if they like, and benefit from a complete, freely-revealed design created by many collaborators. Indeed, today it is possible for such self-formed householder design teams to greatly exceed producer teams in scale. A producer, for example, might dedicate a team of 15 employees to a particular project. A householder team can in a matter of weeks scale from a single individual to a team of tens or hundreds of expert participants – all working at their own cost, and all openly sharing their design contributions.

=== Other research foci ===
Eric von Hippel's overall research goal is to explore the phenomenon of user and lead user innovation deeply. He in addition seeks to connect his findings to other fields in a way that makes them easily accessible to and usable by both researchers and practitioners.

With respect to explorations of the phenomena underlying user innovation, an example from von Hippel's work with colleagues is development of the concept of, and explorations of the impacts of, "sticky information" on the different types of innovations users and producers tend to develop. Specifically, research has shown that innovation users are most likely to develop functionally novel types of innovations. In sharp contrast, producers have been found most likely to develop improvements to products of already-known functions along "dimensions of merit" such as increased performance, reliability, and convenience. An explanation for this pattern put forward by von Hippel and colleagues builds upon the finding that information is often "sticky" - that is, both difficult and costly to transfer from its source of origin to innovators located at another site. It has also been found that innovators tend to innovate using what they already know. As a consequence, it is reasonable that - since users know more about their needs and usage details than producers do - user innovators are likely to use the information they know best to develop novel applications. Similarly, since producers know more about the solution approaches in which they specialize than do most users, it is reasonable that producers would use this knowledge to develop dimension of merit improvement innovations to existing functions. This is the pattern that has been found via empirical research.

With respect to practical applications of user innovation phenomena by practitioners, consider work on "toolkits for user innovation" by von Hippel and his colleagues. Once practitioners understand the importance of user innovation, he argues, it becomes clear that it will be valuable for producers to support users in their efforts to develop the innovations they want. One form of such help producers - and fellow users - can offer are toolkits specifically designed for use by innovation users. Toolkits for user innovation are coordinated sets of "user-friendly" design tools that enable users to develop new product innovations for themselves. They enable users to work in their own design language rather than in the design language a producer might use. They also allow users to conduct trial and error problem-solving: iteratively creating design solutions, and then testing them with simulation software to see if the solutions are really what the user desires. These toolkits are often developed by producers of types of products that users want to buy in customized form. For example, producers of outdoor decks offer potential customers toolkits that enable them to design the shape of deck they want with no knowledge of how a deck is actually constructed. The user simply sketches shapes until satisfied with deck function. Then the software incorporated in the deck design toolkit automatically designs the structure of the deck suitable to support that user-designed custom shape - and also provides the customer with a list of materials to buy - or contractor to hire - to get the design actually built.

== Inspiration and influences ==
Early in his research career, von Hippel was influenced by the work of Nathan Rosenberg of Stanford University, whose research looks at the economics of technological change, and the economic role of science, as well as economic history and development. He was also importantly influenced by Professor Richard Nelson of Columbia University, who has focused on the processes of long-run economic change, with particular emphasis on technological advances. An additional early influence was Professor Ann Carter of Brandeis, who used input-output tables as a central tool in her research and specialized in the economics of information, technical change, and technology transfer.

More recently, a central source of influence and inspiration for von Hippel has been colleagues in the Open and User Innovation Society (OUI). This academic society, now with a membership of hundreds, focuses on research related to innovation processes by users, and the open sharing of innovation via innovation commons.

== Family ==
von Hippel's wife Jessie is an editor of scholarly books and journal articles and also a tennis player. His daughter Christiana received her ScD from the Harvard T. H. Chan School of Public Health in 2018. She studies health-related user innovations with an emphasis on behavioral innovations. His son Eric James graduated from Emerson College in Media Studies and is in real estate management.

== See also ==
- Lead user
- Patient Innovation
- Private-collective model of innovation
- User innovation
