= Toolkits for user innovation =

Design method

Toolkits for user innovation and custom design are coordinated sets of “user-friendly” design tools. They are designed to support users who may wish to develop products or services for their own use. The problem toolkits are developed to solve is that, while user designers may know their own needs better than do producers, their technical design skills may be less than those of producer-employed developers. For example, expert users of tennis rackets – or expert users of custom integrated circuits – generally know more than producers do about the function they want a product (or service) to serve. However, they are often not as good as producer engineers at actually designing the product they need.

== Purpose ==
Toolkits for user innovation (or design customization) solve this problem in two steps. First, they divide the total set of design problems facing product designers into two categories:

1. design problems for which users’ special knowledge of a need is important;
2. problems that do not require user knowledge to resolve.

Toolkits then offer easy-to-use tools to enable user designers to solve type (1) problems without needing to have technical skills equal to those of producer engineers. Type (2) problems are then assigned either toolkit software for automatic solution or to producers’ technical design specialists.

== Example of a toolkit to support DIY design by users ==
To illustrate the basic concepts of a toolkit for product innovation and product customization by users, consider a house owner who wants to self-design a custom deck that is “just right” for his or her specific backyard physical setting and planned deck usages. The house owner will know the functions they want their custom deck to serve – outdoor barbecues for up to 10 people, play space for their kids, etc. But suppose that these users – like the vast majority of deck users – do not actually have the architectural and engineering skills required to create a complete, buildable design for the deck they want. A “deck design” toolkit solves this problem by inviting the DIY user to design only the top surface of deck they want by simply sketching the deck size and shape they have in mind onto a computer screen. Note that this top surface is the only portion of the deck that will directly interact with planned user activities on the deck – and so accordingly is the only aspect of deck design for which specialized user knowledge of intended deck uses is relevant.

The toolkit then further helps the user to check deck surface functionality via a simulation of just that part of the deck design. For example, users might be asked to select and place images of items like chairs and tables on the deck surface they have sketched out. This will assist them to determine whether the size and shape of the deck surface they have designed will actually be adequate for their intended uses. If not, they can easily make adjustments directly on the computer screen to solve the usage problems they see, and then assess again to see if they are now satisfied. Again, in this simple example, deck size and shape are the only function-related design problems for which user knowledge is essential.

Next, software incorporated into the deck design toolkit takes over and automatically does “everything else” required to design a complete deck. That is, it designs the structure of a deck suitable to support the size and shape of the deck surface the user has designed. Solving this second set of design problems requires specialized structural engineering knowledge that the user is unlikely to have – for example, how many concrete foundation piers a deck will require for long-term safety and stability. However, since solving these problems does not require users’ special knowledge regarding intended use, it can be performed by the producer without further user inputs – in this case automatically by means of producer-designed software.

== Toolkits vs. traditional marketing research ==
Traditionally, in the product development process, producer firms assign market research specialists to determine users’ needs. Marketing thus developed numerous “voice of the customer” market research techniques aiming to identify user’s needs and preferences. These then become goals for new product developers to meet. Advances in technology such as computerization of production have more recently enabled many firms to abandon the “one size fits all” model, and to offer customers “configurators” via which they can to some extent adapt products to their individual preferences. In 2002, von Hippel and Katz conceptualized the role of toolkits in the innovation process in a more general way that extends far beyond customization. A toolkit lets the producer actually abandon the attempt to understand user needs in detail in favor of transferring need-related aspects of product and service development to users.

Today, toolkits for user innovation are routinely used in fields ranging from neural network design to the design of new biological systems in synthetic biology. Research is also going on with respect to improving their function. For example, it has been found that the provision of starting solutions, a transparent process, an appropriate solution space, and peer feedback can increase toolkit utility as well as toolkit users’ satisfaction.

== The general value of toolkits for DIY user design ==
Toolkits can be designed to support end user innovation and/or end user customization. In the case of the deck design illustration just provided, the toolkit is clearly capable of deck customization only. However, the same concepts are widely applied today in many fields. For example, innovation toolkits have been designed that enable users with no knowledge of solid-state physics or semiconductor design to create custom semiconductors that will carry out exactly the functions they specify, ranging from the simulation of artificial life to the design of very novel controllers for autonomous electric vehicles. To accomplish this, semiconductor architectures like “sea of (digital logic) gates” are designed to separate out the physics of gate design from function design. Similarly, toolkits have been designed that enable designers with very little knowledge of manufacturing to design producible parts for their projects. Again, as in the deck design case, design of the function of the parts is left to user expertise assisted by CAD. Then, producer expertise, encoded into toolkit software often called CAM (Computer Assisted Manufacturing), is used to convert the user functional part designs into designs that are well-suited to high-quality and economical manufacturing in volume.

The value of toolkits to professional designers is very clear. Because of the very large functional and economic advantages they offer to product designers, CAD-CAM toolkits have largely swept away earlier manual design processes in all fields where design decisions can be digitized. Toolkits are also increasingly being offered to consumers to enable them to customize the products they purchase. The deck design toolkit discussed earlier is an example of this.

== The special value toolkits provide to consumer DIY projects ==
For consumers, the value of toolkits has two major elements: the self-perceived quality of the design that users create for themselves, and the process fun and learning that consumers can gain by engaging in custom design using a toolkit.

With respect to self-perceived quality, there is strong research evidence that consumers prefer their self-designed products over products of similar function designed by professional designers. For example, Franke and Piller conducted an experiment in which they offered one group of individuals the opportunity to customize and buy a watch they designed themselves with the aid of a toolkit. A second group was offered the opportunity to buy any one of the three most successful watches in the market, designed by professional designers. The objective quality of all watches (quality of materials, functions, etc.) was identical in both groups. However, it turned out that toolkit users were willing to pay 100% more to buy the watch they had designed themselves than members of the second group were willing to pay for any of the professionally-designed watches offered to them for purchase. This high additional value has been confirmed in several studies using different toolkits and in different product areas such as breakfast cereals, carving skis, mobile phone covers, fountain pens, kitchens, newspapers, scarves, and t-shirts.

Several factors contribute to the value increment toolkit-assisted self-design provides to consumer-designers. The most obvious reason for increased subjective value is the increased preference fit. Toolkits allow to tailoring the product to the users’ individual preferences. Given that these preferences are different and significantly matter to users, the individualization possibility will lead to a higher subjective value. The process of using toolkits to quickly try many design variations also enables consumers to more deeply understand their own preferences. Even short self‐design processes with a relatively simple toolkit bring about significant and time‐stable enhancements of preference insight and allows users to obtain high value from new individual products.

Another quality of a custom product is uniqueness. Toolkits enable customers to more easily differentiate themselves from others through their own custom product design, a second driver of product value). Finally, the creative process itself is also valued by many people. With a toolkit, the customer is the designer, not just a consumer. Experiments confirm the importance of the “I designed it myself” effect in the toolkit-assisted custom product design.
