= International Association of Innovation Professionals =

- Abbreviation: IAOIP-GIMI
- Founded at: United States
- Type: Non-profit
- Region served: Worldwide
- Members: 14000
- Co-President: Brett Trusko, Hitendra Patel
- Key people: Ronald Jonash, Erila Haska
- Website: www.giminstitute.org

The International Association of Innovation Professionals (IAOIP) is a professional association for innovation professionals with 4,000 members in more than 100 countries as of 2021.

The International Association of Innovation Professionals (IAOIP) announced in August 2023 that it would merge with the Global Innovation Management Institute (GIMI) based in Cambridge, Massachusetts, United States.

== Journal ==
International Journal of Innovation Science
- Discipline: Innovation
- Language: English
- Edited by: English

Publication details
- Publisher: Emerald Group Publishing
- Frequency: Quarterly

Standard abbreviations
- ISO 4: Int. J. Innov. Sci.

Indexing
- ISSN: 1757-2223
- LCCN: 2017208535
- OCLC no.: 1062086374

Links
- Journal homepage

The International Journal of Innovation Science is published by GIMI-IAOIP. The journal has published articles on topics such as user innovation, role of diversity in innovation, and design theory. The journal is indexed in Scopus and Web of Science.

== See also ==
- Innovation
- Innovation Management
- ISO 56000
- ISO TC 279
