= Cult (disambiguation) =

A cult is a religious or social group with socially deviant or novel beliefs and practices.

Cult or cults may also refer to:

== Geography ==
- Cult, Haute-Saône, France
- Cults, Aberdeen, a suburb of Aberdeen, Scotland
- Cults Academy, a school in Cults, Aberdeenshire
- Cults railway station, a former station near Aberdeen
- Cults, Fife, a parish in the Fife area, Scotland

== Sociology and religion ==
- Cult (religious practice), literally the "care" owed to God or gods and to temples, shrines, or churches
- New religious movement, cult in a common modern sense
- Cult following, a group of fans who are highly dedicated to a specific work of culture
- Cargo cult, a religious practice ritually mimicking another culture, popular in Melanesia in the late 1900s
- Cult of personality, when an individual uses mass media, propaganda, or other methods, to create an idealized, heroic, and at times, worshipful image
- Imperial cult, a form of state religion in which a ruler is worshipped as a demigod or deity
  - Roman imperial cult, identified emperors and some members of their families with the divinely sanctioned authority of the Roman State
- Greek hero cult, one of the most distinctive features of ancient Greek religion

== Film and television ==
- Cult film
- Cult (2013 film), a Japanese film
- Cult (2026 film), an Indian Kannada-language film
- Cult (2026 Telugu film), an Indian Telugu-language film
- Cult (TV channel), an Italian TV Channel
- The Cult (TV series), a 2009 New Zealand television drama series
- Cult (TV series), a 2013 U.S. television series
- American Horror Story: Cult, the seventh season of the FX horror anthology series American Horror Story

== Music ==
- The Cult (band), an English rock band
- Cult (Apocalyptica album), a 2000 album by cello metal band Apocalyptica
- Cult (Bayside album), 2014
- Cults (band), a New York-based indie pop band
  - Cults (album), their 2011 debut album

== Other uses ==
- Cults (3D printing marketplace)
- Committee on Culture and Education (CULT), a committee of the European Parliament
- Cult (book), a management book by Arindam Chaudhuri
- Cults: Faith, Healing and Coercion, a book by Marc Galanter

== See also ==
- The Cult (disambiguation)
- Kult (disambiguation)
- Confraternities in Nigeria, also known as "campus cults"
- Category:Cults
