= Exnovation =

Antonym of innovation

Exnovation means the process of terminating a practice, or the use of a technology or product, within an organization, community, or society. Put simply, it can be described as the opposite of innovation. Exnovation has also been described as the "flipside of innovation", or the "lesser-known sibling of innovation".

In commerce and management, exnovation can occur when products and processes that have been tested and confirmed to be best-in-class are standardized to ensure that they are not innovated further. Companies that have followed exnovation as a strategy to improve organizational performance include General Electric, Ford Motor Company and American Airlines.

One of the earliest usages of the term came in 1981, when John Kimberly referred to "removal of innovation from an organisation". In 1996 A. Sandeep provided a modern definition of exnovation as the philosophy of not innovating – in other words, ensuring that best-in-class entities are not innovated further. Since then "exnovation" has become a notable parlance in various practices, from management to medicine.

In recent years, the concept has been increasingly taken up in sustainability and transition research to designate and investigate the deliberate phase-out of unsustainable technologies, products, and practices, particularly in relation to energy transitions and a coal phase-out.

Exnovation and innovation are interrelated: "On the one hand, exnovating products and practices creates spaces for new products and practices. On the other hand, the promise of a new product or practice helps eliminating old products and practices."

== See also ==
- Collaborative innovation network – a social construct used to describe innovative teams
- Design strategy
- Diffusion of innovations – a theory that seeks to explain how, why, and at what rate new ideas and technology spread through cultures
- Frugal innovation – process of reducing the complexity and cost of a good and its production
- Ideas bank – shared resource, usually a website, where people post, exchange, discuss, and polish new ideas
- Open innovation – a paradigm that assumes that organizations can and should use external ideas as well as internal ideas
- Pro-innovation bias – the belief that an innovation should be adopted by whole society without the need of its alteration
- Technology forecasting – the prediction of future characteristics of useful technological machines, procedures or techniques
- Technology scouting – a method of technology forecasting
- Nuclear power phase-out
- Coal phase-out
- Phase-out of incandescent light bulbs
- Phase-out of fossil fuel vehicles
