= Stephen J. Kline =

American mechanical engineer

- Born: Stephen Jay Kline; February 25, 1922
- Died: October 24, 1997 (aged 75)
- Education: Stanford University (BA, MS); Massachusetts Institute of Technology (ScD)
- Known for: Structure of turbulent boundary layers Hydrogen bubble flow visualization Kline–Rosenberg chain-linked model of innovation
- Awards: National Academy of Engineering (1981); ASME Fluids Engineering Division Award (1975); ASME Robert Henry Thurston Lecture Award (1989); ASME Medal
- Scientific career
- Fields: Mechanical engineering Fluid dynamics Innovation studies
- Workplaces: Stanford University

Stephen Jay Kline (February 25, 1922 – October 24, 1997) was an American mechanical engineer and Professor of Mechanical Engineering at Stanford University. He was known for his experimental work on the physics of turbulent shear flows and for interdisciplinary work on the innovation process, including the chain-linked model, and on the philosophy of science and technology. He was elected to the National Academy of Engineering in 1981, and received the 1989 American Society of Mechanical Engineers (ASME) Robert Henry Thurston Lecture Award.

== Education and career ==
Kline earned a BA and an MS from Stanford University and a doctorate (ScD) from the Massachusetts Institute of Technology in 1952. He joined Stanford in 1952 as an assistant professor of mechanical engineering, rising to full professor and serving as a department leader, and he was named Professor Emeritus. At Stanford, he was also a co-founder of the university's Science, Technology and Society Program.

== Research contributions ==
Kline's best-known scientific work concerned the structure of turbulent boundary layers. Working with W. C. Reynolds and others at Stanford in the early 1960s, he used flow visualization techniques (including the hydrogen bubble method) to reveal organized, intermittent "bursting" structures in the near-wall region of turbulent flows. The resulting paper in the Journal of Fluid Mechanics in 1967 became one of the most-cited papers in the field. His NAE election citation recognized "contributions to understanding the physics underlying turbulent shear flows, methods for internal flow design, and leadership in technology–society programs." He also wrote Similitude and Approximation Theory on dimensional analysis and modeling.

In the later part of his career, Kline turned to the study of technological innovation and multidisciplinary thought. With economist Nathan Rosenberg he developed the chain-linked model of innovation (1986), an influential alternative to the linear model of innovation, an argument he also made in his widely cited article "Innovation Is Not a Linear Process" (Research Management, 1985). He summarized wrote the book Conceptual Foundations for Multidisciplinary Thinking (Stanford University Press, 1995).

== Awards and honors ==
Kline received the ASME Fluids Engineering Division Award in 1975 and was elected to the National Academy of Engineering in 1981. He received the 1989 ASME Robert Henry Thurston Lecture Award, delivering a lecture entitled "Innovation Styles in Japan and the United States: Cultural Bases; Implications for Competitiveness". He was also awarded the ASME Medal.

== Selected works ==
- Kline, S. J. Similitude and Approximation Theory. McGraw-Hill, 1965 (reissued Springer, 1986).
- Kline, S. J., W. C. Reynolds, F. A. Schraub, and P. W. Runstadler. "The Structure of Turbulent Boundary Layers." Journal of Fluid Mechanics 30, no. 4 (1967): 741–773.
- Kline, S. J. "Innovation Is Not a Linear Process." Research Management 28 (July–August 1985): 36–45.
- Kline, S. J. Innovation Styles in Japan and the United States: Cultural Bases; Implications for Competitiveness. The 1989 Thurston Lecture, Report INN-3, Dept. of Mechanical Engineering, Stanford University, 1990.
- Kline, S. J. Conceptual Foundations for Multidisciplinary Thinking. Stanford University Press, 1995.
