= Chain-linked model =

Model of innovation

The chain-linked model or Kline model of innovation was introduced by mechanical engineer Stephen J. Kline in 1985, and further described by Kline and economist Nathan Rosenberg in 1986. The chain-linked model is an attempt to describe complexities in the innovation process. The model is regarded as Kline's most significant contribution.

== Description ==
In the chain-linked model, new knowledge is not necessarily the driver for innovation. Instead, the process begins with the identification of an unfilled market need. This drives research and design, then redesign and production, and finally marketing, with complex feedback loops between all the stages. There are also important feedback loops with the organization's and the world's stored base of knowledge, with new basic research conducted or commissioned as necessary, to fill in gaps.

It is often contrasted with the so-called linear model of innovation, in which basic research leads to applied development, then engineering, then manufacturing, and finally marketing and distribution.

== Applications ==
The Kline model was conceived primarily with commercial industrial settings in mind, but has found broad applicability in other settings, for example in military technology development. Variations and extensions of the model have been described by a number of investigators.

== See also ==
- Actor-network theory
- Cybernetics
- Creativity techniques
- Crowdsourcing
- Diffusion of innovations
- Innovation
- List of emerging technologies
- New product development
- Open innovation
- Participatory design
- Phase–gate model
- Pro-innovation bias
- Product lifecycle
- Social shaping of technology
- Strategic foresight
- Technological change
- User-centered design
- User innovation
