= Abell 2244 BCG =

Type-cD galaxy in the constellation Hercules

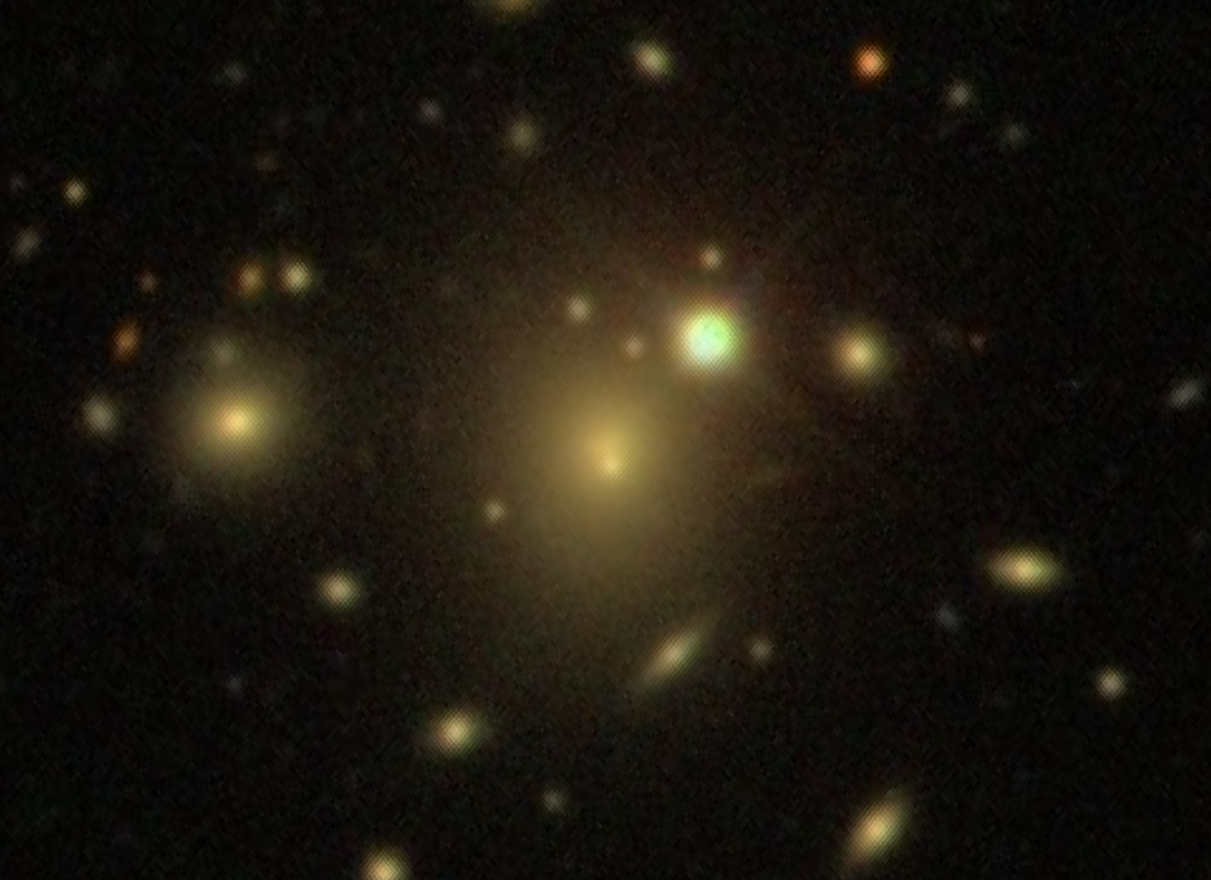
- SDSS image of Abell 2244 BCG.

Observation data (J2000.0 epoch)
- Constellation: Hercules
- Right ascension: 17^{h} 02^{m} 42.50^{s}
- Declination: +34° 03′ 36.65″
- Redshift: 0.099298
- Heliocentric radial velocity: 29,769 ± 11 km/s
- Distance: 1,449.6 ± 101.5 Mly (444.45 ± 31.11 Mpc)
- Group or cluster: Abell 2244
- magnitude (J): 12.72
- magnitude (H): 11.38

Characteristics
- Type: BrClG
- Size: ~687,000 ly (210.5 kpc) (estimated)

Other designations
- 2MASX J17024247+3403363, Abell 2244:[ZAC2011] BCG, MaNGA 08613-12705, LEDA 140689, NVSS J170242+340336, WHL J170242.5+340335 BCG, LEDA 2043207

Abell 2244 BCG (short for Abell 2244 Brightest Cluster Galaxy) is a massive elliptical galaxy of Type-cD located in the constellation of Hercules. The redshift of the galaxy is (z) 0.099 and it was first discovered from a CCD photometry study by astronomers in January 1983. It is the brightest cluster galaxy of the galaxy cluster Abell 2244, with it being offset by 69 kiloparsecs from the X-ray peak.

== Description ==
Abell 2244 BCG is a Type-cD or a central dominant galaxy of Abell 2244 with the size being much bigger compared to other galaxy members in the cluster. The K-band magnitude is estimated to be -26.97 ± 0.09 and the U-R color gradient is -0.05 ± 0.10 magnitude. The total stellar mass of the galaxy is 0.62 × 10^{12} M_{☉}.

Radio mapping at six centimeters by Very Large Array (VLA) has found the central radio source is mostly unresolved with a radio power of 21.96 W/Hz. The source's radio luminosity when observed with VLA in 1994, is calculated to be 21.82 W Hz^{−1}. The radio core is found resolved at 10 GHz frequencies with a total flux density of 0.6 mJy and has a steep index of 1.29 ± 0.30. A study published in 2004, has also found the active galactic nucleus (AGN) of the cD galaxy does not exhibit any signs of recent activity. The hydrogen-alpha emission line luminosity is 0.333 × 10^{40} erg s^{−1}.

Evidence also found the cD galaxy has an offset nucleus or a companion object in its envelope. When observed, it is found located 2.5 arcseconds towards the direction of south, with the galaxy's isophotes depicted as having an elliptical appearance closer towards the center. The peak surface brightness of cD galaxy has been estimated to be 20.5 magnitude per arcsecond while the surface brightness of the companion is 19.8. This companion is suggested to be merging together with the cD galaxy, with its velocity towards it only being 50 kilometers per seconds.
