= Godin (surname) =

Godin is a French surname. Notable people with the surname include:

== Arts and entertainment ==
- Christophe Godin (born 1968), French musician
- Dave Godin (1936–2004), English fan of American soul music
- Nicolas Godin (born 1969), French musician
- Noël Godin (1945–2026), Belgian humorist

== Politicians ==
- François Benjamin Godin (1828–1888), Quebec politician
- Gérald Godin (1938–1994), Quebec poet and politician
- Jason Godin (born 1993), Canadian politician
- Joseph Godin dit Bellefontaine (1695–1763), French deputy and military commander
- Maurice Godin (politician) (born 1932), Canadian politician
- Osias Godin (1911–1988), Canadian politician
- Pierre Godin (born 1947), Canadian politician
- Yvon Godin (born 1955), Canadian politician

== Sport ==
- Carel Godin de Beaufort (1934–1964), Dutch racing driver
- Diego Godín (born 1986), Uruguayan football player
- Eddy Godin (born 1957), Canadian ice hockey forward
- Elodie Godin (born 1985), French Olympic basketball player
- Henri Godin (1892–1980), Belgian Olympic runner

== Other ==
- Benoît Godin (1958-2021) Canadian political scientist and sociologist
- Guillaume Pierre Godin (c. 1260–1336), French Dominican theologian and cardinal
- Isabel Godin des Odonais (1728–1792), made arduous 20-year journey in South America
- Jean-Baptiste André Godin (1817–1888), French industrialist
- Louis Godin (1704–1760), French astronomer
- Nesse Godin (born 1928), Lithuanian Holocaust survivor
- Godin de Sainte-Croix, French military officer
- Seth Godin (born 1960), American author of business books

== See also ==
- Godina
