= Kult =

Kult or KULT may refer to:

- Kult (band), Polish rock band
- Kult (card game), collectible card game
- Kult (role-playing game)
- Kult: The Temple of Flying Saucers, 1989 video game
- Kult: Heretic Kingdoms, a 2004 video game
- KULT-LP, a low-power radio station (94.5 FM) licensed to Cedar Rapids, Iowa, United States
- K.U.L.T. 99.1 FM, a radio station hosted by Julian Casablancas in Grand Theft Auto Online
- KULT, an mnemonic for causes of high anion gap metabolic acidosis

== See also ==
- Cult (disambiguation)
