= The Cult (disambiguation) =

The Cult are an English rock band.

The Cult may also refer to:

- The Cult (album), a 1994 album from the rock group The Cult
- The Cult (novel), a 1978 novel by Max Ehrlich
- The Cult (TV series), a New Zealand serial drama television series
- Batman: The Cult, a 1988 Batman comic book mini-series
- The Cult, a 1972 movie re-released in 1976 as The Manson Massacre

== See also ==
- Cult (disambiguation)
