= Innovation management =

Systematic planning, management and control of innovation in organizations

Innovation management is a combination of the management of innovation processes, and change management. It refers to product, business process, marketing and organizational innovation. Innovation management is the subject of ISO 56000 (formerly 50500) series standards being developed by ISO TC 279.

Innovation management includes a set of tools that allow managers plus workers or users to cooperate with a common understanding of processes and goals. Innovation management allows the organization to respond to external or internal opportunities, and use its creativity to introduce new ideas, processes or products. It is not relegated to research and development; it involves workers or users at every level in contributing creatively to an organization's product or service development and marketing.

By using innovation management tools, management can trigger and deploy the creative capabilities of the work force for the continuous development of an organization. Common tools include brainstorming, prototyping, product lifecycle management, idea management, design thinking, TRIZ, Phase–gate model, project management, product line planning and portfolio management. The process integrates organization, technology and market by conducting and iterating on activities including search, select, implement, and capture.

The product lifecycle of products or services is getting shorter because of increased competition and quicker time-to-market, forcing organisations to reduce their time-to-market. Innovation managers must therefore decrease development time, without sacrificing quality, and while meeting the needs of the market.

== Innovation management ==
Innovation management (IM) is based on some of the ideas put forth by the Austrian economist Joseph Schumpeter, working during the 1930s, who identified innovation as a significant factor in economic growth. His book "Capitalism, Socialism and Democracy" first fully developed the concept of creative destruction.

Innovation management helps an organization grasp an opportunity and use it to create and introduce new ideas, processes, or products. It dictates how flexibly an opportunity is developed and integrated into investment allocations. For projects facing significant market uncertainty, real option analysis serves as a vital tool to identify and price this developmental flexibility. Ultimately, this governance framework creates a structured sequence of milestones, helping the organization systematically discover whether, when, and how to fully pursue the opportunity. Creativity is the basis of innovation management; the end goal is a change in services or business process. Innovative ideas are the result of two consecutive steps, imitation and invention.

By utilizing innovation management tools, management can trigger and deploy the creative capabilities of the work force for the continuous development of an organization. Common tools include brainstorming, prototyping, product lifecycle management, ideation, TRIZ, Phase–gate model, bonus payments, project management, product line planning and portfolio management. The process can be viewed as an evolutionary integration of organization, technology, and market, by iterating series of activities: search, select, implement and capture.

Innovation processes can be pushed or pulled through development. A pushed process is based on existing or new technology that the organization has access to. The goal is to find profitable applications for the already-existing technology. A pulled process, by contrast, is based on finding areas where customers' needs are not met and finding solutions to those needs. To succeed with either method, an understanding of both the market and the problems are needed. By creating multi-functional development teams, containing both workers or users plus marketers, both dimensions can be solved.

Innovation, although not sufficient alone, is a necessary prerequisite for the continued survival and development of enterprises. The most direct way of business innovation is through technological innovation, disruptive innovation or social innovation. Management of innovation, however, plays a significant role in promoting technological and institutional innovation.

The goal of innovation management within an organization is to cultivate a suitable environment to encourage innovation. The suitable environment would help the organizations get more cooperation projects, even 'the take-off platform for business ventures'. Senior management's support is crucial to successful innovation; clear direction, endorsement, and support are essential to innovation pursuits.

== Managing complex innovation ==
Innovation is often a technological change that outperforms a previous practice. To lead or sustain with innovations, managers need to concentrate heavily on the innovation network, which requires deep understanding of the complexity of innovation. Collaboration is an important source of innovation. Innovations are increasingly brought to the market by networks of organizations, selected according to their comparative advantages, and operating in a coordinated manner. Highlighting the importance of collaboration, a study within an Indian IT services firm found that innovation outcomes were stronger in teams with more coordinated office presence than in teams whose members’ office and home schedules were more scattered.

When a technology goes through a major transformation phase and yields a successful innovation, it becomes a great learning experience, not only for the parent industry but other industries as well. Big innovations are generally the outcome of intra- and interdisciplinary networking among technological sectors, along with combination of implicit and explicit knowledge. Networking is required, but network integration is the key to success for complex innovation. Social economic zones, technology corridors, free trade agreements, and technology clusters are some of the ways to encourage organizational networking and cross-functional innovations.

== Tools and methodologies ==
Antonio Hidalgo and Jose Albor proposed the use of typologies as an innovation management tool. The study conducted at a European level used 10 typologies for knowledge-driven Innovation Management Tools. These typologies were found by looking at 32 characteristics that classify Innovation Management Tools. Hidalgo and Albors were able to narrow the list down to 8 criteria (knowledge-driven focus, strategic impact, degree of availability, level of documentation, practical usefulness, age of the IMT, required resources for implementation, measurability), that are especially relevant for IMTs in the knowledge-driven economy (knowledge economy). The advantage of using typologies is the easy integration of new methods and the availability of a broader scope of tools.

IMT typologies	Methodologies and tools
Knowledge management tools	knowledge audit, knowledge mapping, document management, intellectual property rights management
Market intelligence techniques	technology watch / search, patent analysis, business intelligence, CRM, geo-marketing
Cooperative and networking tools	groupware, teambuilding, supply chain management, industrial clustering, Agile
Human resources management techniques	remote work, corporate intranet, online recruitment, educational technology, competence management, flat organization
Interface management approaches	research and development - marketing interface management, concurrent engineering
Creativity development techniques	brainstorming, lateral thinking, TRIZ, SCAMPER method, mind mapping
Process improvement techniques	benchmarking, workflow, business process re-engineering, just-in-time manufacturing
Innovation project management techniques	project management, project appraisal, project portfolio management
Design and product development management tools	computer-aided design, rapid prototyping, usability approaches, quality function deployment, value analysis
Business creation tools	business simulation, business plan, spin-off from research to market

Criteria for selection of tools: IMTs that were sufficiently developed and standardized, that aimed to improve the competitiveness of firms by focusing on knowledge and that were freely accessible on the market and not subject to any copyright or licensing agreement.

With the current innovation environment becoming increasingly competitive and costly, many corporate innovation managers are thinking about how AI can be applied to their companies' innovations. AI can provide a lot of auxiliary help, information management can be handled quickly, using AI to support the innovation process can reduce risk and cost, and bring more value to the company.

== Economic theory ==
In economic theory, the management of innovation has been studied by Philippe Aghion and Jean Tirole (1994). Their work is based on the Grossman-Hart-Moore property rights approach to the theory of the firm. According to this theory, the optimal allocation of property rights helps to alleviate the hold-up problem (an underinvestment problem that occurs when investments are non-contractible). In the work of Oliver Hart and his co-authors, the parties agree on the ownership structure that maximizes the parties' expected total surplus (which they can divide with suitable up-front transfer payments according to their ex ante bargaining power). In contrast, Aghion and Tirole argue that in the relationship between a research unit and a customer the parties might not agree on the optimal ownership structure, since research units are often cash-constrained and thus cannot make up-front payments to customers. The model is also known as "the R&D game" (Tirole, 1999). Laboratory research using the methods of experimental economics has found support for the theory.

== See also ==
- Chief idea officer
- Chief innovation officer
- Collaborative innovation network – a social construct used to describe innovative teams
- Design strategy
- Diffusion of innovations – a theory that seeks to explain how, why, and at what rate new ideas and technology spread through cultures
- Frugal innovation – process of reducing the complexity and cost of a good and its production
- Ideas bank – shared resource, usually a website, where people post, exchange, discuss, and polish new ideas
- Open innovation – a paradigm that assumes that organizations can and should use external ideas as well as internal ideas
- Pro-innovation bias – the belief that an innovation should be adopted by whole society without the need of its alteration
- Technology forecasting – the prediction of future characteristics of useful technological machines, procedures or techniques
- Technology scouting – a method of technology forecasting
