= William Craig Reynolds =

William C. Reynolds
- Born: March 16, 1933; Berkeley, California
- Died: January 3, 2004 (aged 70); Los Altos, California
- Education: Stanford University
- Awards: Otto Laporte Award (1992)
- Scientific career
- Fields: Fluid mechanics
- Workplaces: Stanford University
- Doctoral advisor: William M. Kays; Stephen J. Kline
- Doctoral students: Fazle Hussain; Parviz Moin

William Craig Reynolds (March 16, 1933 – January 3, 2004) was a fluid physicist and mechanical engineer who specialized in turbulent flow and computational fluid dynamics.

Reynolds completed his undergraduate degrees, as well as his doctorate, all at Stanford University, in 1954, 1955, and 1957, respectively, after which he joined the faculty. He was chairman of the Mechanical Engineering Department from 1972 to 1982 and again from 1989 to 1992.

Reynolds was one of the pioneers in Large eddy simulation for fluid modeling. He was elected to the National Academy of Engineering in 1979. He won the Fluid Engineering Award of the American Society of Mechanical Engineers in 1989 and the Otto Laporte Award by the American Physical Society in 1992.

Following his death, the Department of Mechanical Engineering at Stanford established the William C. Reynolds Memorial Award and Lecture.

== Selected publications ==
- Reynolds, W.C. (1976), "Computation of Turbulent Flows", Annual Review of Fluid Mechanics, 8: 183–208, Bibcode:1976AnRFM...8..183R, doi:10.1146/annurev.fl.08.010176.001151, hdl:2060/19750022392, S2CID 122972588
