= Ruta N =

Public joint venture

Corporation Ruta N (better known as Ruta N) is a public joint venture between the mayor's office of Medellín (Colombia), UNE and EPM. Founded in 2009, Ruta N was created in order to inspire and encourage innovation in the city and create favorable conditions for business and entrepreneurship.

Ruta N Complex is located in the "innovation district" of Medellín, a newly created sector located in the north of the city in the Sevilla neighborhood. The offices consist of three buildings, one originally dedicated to Hewlett-Packard and two others used as a landing coworking space to house companies of any size, startup companies, laboratories, and the offices of Ruta N personnel.

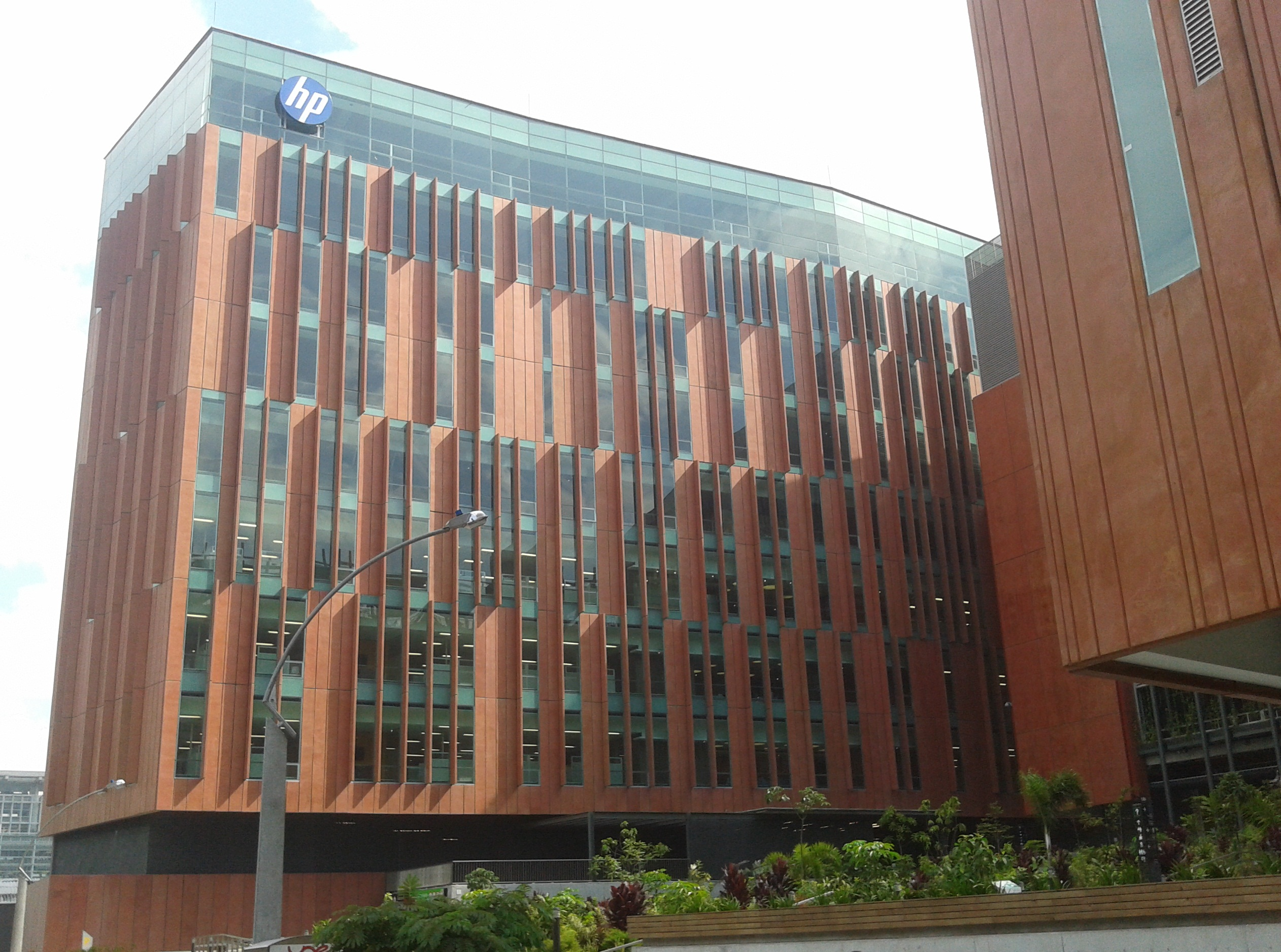
The Ruta N Complex, located in the Sevilla neighborhood of Medellín, next to the University of Antioquia.

== History ==
Corporation Ruta N was founded in 2009 as a regional innovation agency to support Medellín's transition from an industrial city into a knowledge city. Ruta N's first years were led by its inaugural director Andrés Montoya Isaza. The second director was Juan Pablo Ortega, an MIT alumnus, who prior to serving as director, worked for EPM. Originally, Hewlett-Packard was slated to invest in Ruta N and persist as a long-term partner, with permanent residency in one of the three buildings. However, citing internal financial and logistical difficulties, the company officially exited its prior agreement with the city of Medellín in June 2015.

In an effort to create a favorable environment for investment and entrepreneurship in the city, Ruta N contains a landing program that provides companies with office space, utilities, and conference rooms at a market cost. In the last 6 years (March 2018), 210 companies have been attracted from 30 countries that have generated more than 2,800 jobs in areas of innovation alone. In November 2015, there were 84 companies in Ruta N's landing program. However, by September 2016, there were more than 141 companies from a combined 23 different countries, directly resulting in 2,111 new jobs in the city since 2012 alone.

Yuxi Pacific was the first company to exit Ruta N's landing program with a successful acquisition. Founded by serial entrepreneur Michael Puscar, Yuxi Pacific used Ruta N's offices to grow to over 100 full-time employees before being acquired in June 2013 by Cincinnati-based Blue Loop Capital. Other successful companies that have been a part of Ruta N's landing program include SproutLoud, XQuire, Idiomotion and Back2U.

On February 10, 2016, recently inaugurated mayor Federico Gutiérrez appointed Alejandro Franco as the new director of Ruta N.

Ruta N is in active competition with other major cities and programs in Central and South America. Other programs with which Ruta N competes include Start-Up Chile, 500 Startups Mexico and Start-Up Brasil.

In an academic article, Morisson (2018) argues that Ruta N has played the role of a knowledge gatekeeper that facilitated the "tropicalization" of extra-regional knowledge to support new technological trajectories for the city of Medellín.

== Descriptions ==
The first floor is composed of the elements of a quadruple helix: university, company, state and citizens (society).. Ruta N can also serve a variety of roles, accompanying early stage companies through the entire lifecycle from product development through seed investment and formulating community and network events to connect those entrepreneurs with venture capitalists and investment firms. This community includes alliances with various universities and La Red de Capital Inteligente (Intelligent Capital Network), a group of more than 30 investment groups in Colombia that meet and collaborate to grow the ecosystem of entrepreneurship in the city.

In addition, Ruta N manages a wide variety of "convocatorias" (public grants) to help bootstrap young companies and provide training programs. According to Juan Camilo Quintero, Ruta N's third director from August 2013 to February 2016, the goal of these convocatorias is to nurture entrepreneurs and stimulate ideas that are reproducible in the marketplace.

== The Ruta N Complex ==
The Ruta N Complex was designed as an eco-friendly building, with a sustainable design and construction materials made from recyclable resources. The building is complete with offices, expansive conference areas, restaurants, and a rooftop terrace. The design focuses on collaboration and has several areas that can be used by entrepreneurs to share ideas and form alliances. It is the first public building in Colombia with a LEED Gold category certification.

== Ruta N Innovation District ==
The district includes 44,905 square meters of infrastructure, created specifically to house both national and international companies from advanced, high-tech sectors.
