= Godina =

Godina is the surname of the following people

- Ferdo Godina (1912–1994), Slovene writer and partisan
- John Godina (born 1972), American shot putter
- Karpo Godina (born 1943), Slovenian cinematographer and film director
- Marco Godina (born 1962), Italian mathematician
- Marko Godina (1943–1986), Slovenian plastic surgeon
- Mátyás Godina (1768–1835), Slovene Lutheran pastor, writer and teacher
- Tanja Godina (born 1970), Slovenian swimmer
- Yelena Godina (born 1977), Russian volleyball player
- Michael F. Godina (born 1986), American (U.S Marine)

== See also ==
- Godin (surname)
