= Fazle Hussain =

American physicist

A. K. M. Fazle Hussain
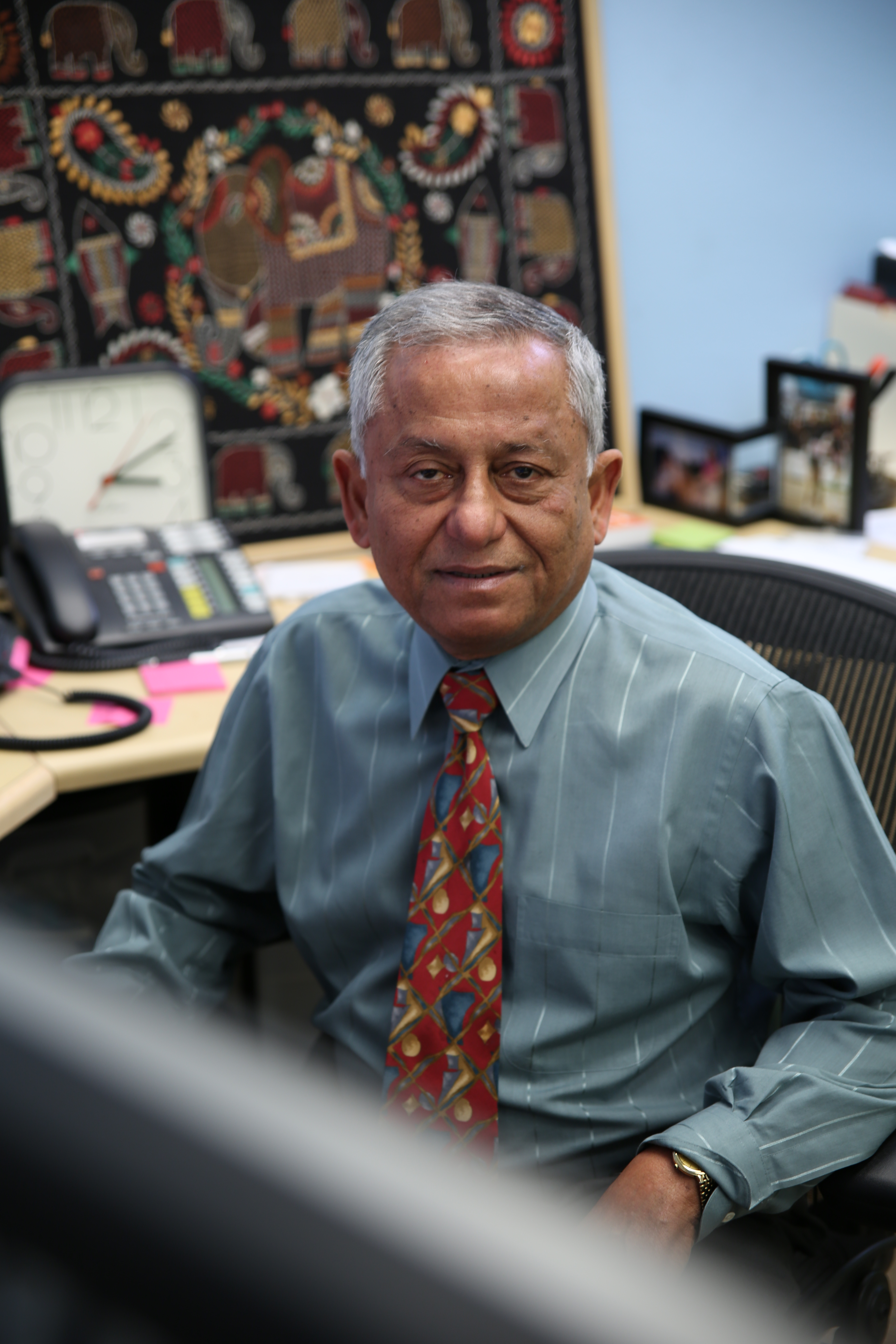
- Born: 20 January 1943 (age 83); Bengal Presidency, British India
- Education: Bangladesh University of Engineering and Technology; Stanford University
- Known for: Application of Nanovector Technology; Vortex dynamics Turbulent Flows; Fluid mechanics Aeroacoustics; Optical measurement techniques
- Scientific career
- Fields: Mechanical engineering Physics
- Workplaces: Texas Tech University; University of Houston; Rice University; Johns Hopkins University; California Institute of Technology; University of Cambridge
- Doctoral advisor: William C. Reynolds

A. K. M. Fazle Hussain (Bengali: এ.কে.এম. ফজলে হুসাইন; born 20 January 1943, in Bangladesh) is a professor of mechanical engineering at Texas Tech University.

== Education ==
Hussain graduated with a BS in mechanical engineering from Bangladesh University of Engineering and Technology in 1963. He went on to attend Stanford University, where he studied under William Craig Reynolds, and received his MS and PhD in mechanical engineering in 1966 and 1969.; he was awarded in 1971 the best PhD dissertation award by Stanford.

Afterwards, Hussain was a post-doctoral fellow at the Johns Hopkins University with Leslie S. G. Kovasznay and Stanley Corrsin.

== Career ==
Hussain was a professor of mechanical engineering at University of Houston from 1976 to 2013. More recently, he was also a professor in the Earth & atmospheric science and physics departments from 2007 to 2013. At UH, he held the Cullen Professorship in mechanical engineering.

In 2001, Hussain was inducted into the National Academy of Engineering for "fundamental experiments and concepts concerning important structures in turbulence, vortex dynamics, and acoustics, and for new turbulence measurement techniques." He is also a member of the advisory board at Shahjalal University of Science and Technology.

== Honors and awards ==
- Freeman Scholar Award of ASME in 1984
- Fluids Engineering Award of ASME in 2000
- Fluid Dynamics Award of AIAA in 2002
- Fluid Dynamics Prize of the American Physical Society in 1998.

== Books ==
Nonlinear Dynamics of Structures, World Scientific, 1991

== Book chapters ==
- "Mechanics of Pulsatile Flows of Relevance to Cardiovascular System," in Cardiovascular Flow Dynamics and Measurements, (Eds. N.H.C. Hwang and N. Norman), University Park Press, Baltimore, pp. 541–632, 1976.
- "New Aspects of Vortex Dynamics Relevant to Coherent Structures in Turbulent Flows," in Eddy Structure Identification (Ed. J.P. Bonnet) Springer, pp. 61–143. 1996.
- "Genesis and Dynamics of Coherent Structures in Near-wall Turbulence: A New Look," in Self-Sustaining Mechanisms of Wall Turbulence (Ed. R. L. Panton) Computational Mechanics Publications, Southampton, pp. 385, (1997).
