= Linear model of innovation =

Innovation model progressing from research to market.

Original model of three phases of technological change: Invention is followed by innovation, then diffusion

The linear model of innovation was an early model designed to understand the relationship of science and technology that begins with basic research that flows into applied research, development and diffusion.

It posits scientific research as the basis of innovation which eventually leads to economic growth.

The model has been criticized by many scholars over decades. The majority of the criticisms pointed out its crudeness and limitations in capturing the sources, process, and effects of innovation. However, it has also been argued that the linear model was simply a creation by academics, debated heavily in academia, but never believed in practice. The model is more fittingly used as a basis to understand more nuanced models.

== Versions ==
Two versions of the linear model of innovation are often presented:

1. "technology push" model
2. "market pull" model

From the 1950s to the mid-1960s, the industrial innovation process was generally perceived as a linear progression from scientific discovery, through technological development in firms, to the marketplace. The stages of the "technology push" model are:

Basic science→Design and engineering→Manufacturing→Marketing→Sales

From the mid-1960s to the early 1970s emerges the second-generation Innovation model, referred to as the "market pull" model of innovation. According to this simple sequential model, the market was the source of new ideas for directing research and development, which had a reactive role in the process. The stages of the "market pull " model are:

Market need—Development—Manufacturing—Sales

The linear models of innovation supported numerous criticisms concerning the linearity of the models. These models ignore the many feedbacks and loops that occur between the different "stages" of the process. Shortcomings and failures that occur at various stages may lead to a reconsideration of earlier steps and this may result in an innovation. A history of the linear model of innovation may be found in Benoît Godin's "The Linear Model of Innovation: The Historical Construction of an Analytical Framework". A critical look at the origin of the terminology and how it may have a dubious history can be found in David Edgerton's "The linear model’ did not exist: Reflections on the history and historiography of science and research in industry in the twentieth century".

== Current models ==
Current models of innovation derive from approaches such as actor–network theory, social shaping of technology and social learning, and provide a much richer picture of the way innovation works. Current ideas in open innovation and user innovation derive from these later ideas.

In the 'phase gate model', the product or services concept is frozen at an early stage to minimize risk. Through enterprise, the innovation process involves a series of sequential phases arranged in a manner that the preceding phase must be cleared before moving to the next phase. Therefore, a project must pass through a gate with the permission of the gatekeeper before moving to the next succeeding phase. Criteria for passing through each gate is defined beforehand. The gatekeeper examines whether the stated objectives for the preceding phase have been properly met or not and whether desired development has taken place during the preceding phase or not.

== See also ==
- Technological change
- Science and technology studies
