= Cult, Haute-Saône =

Cult
- Commune
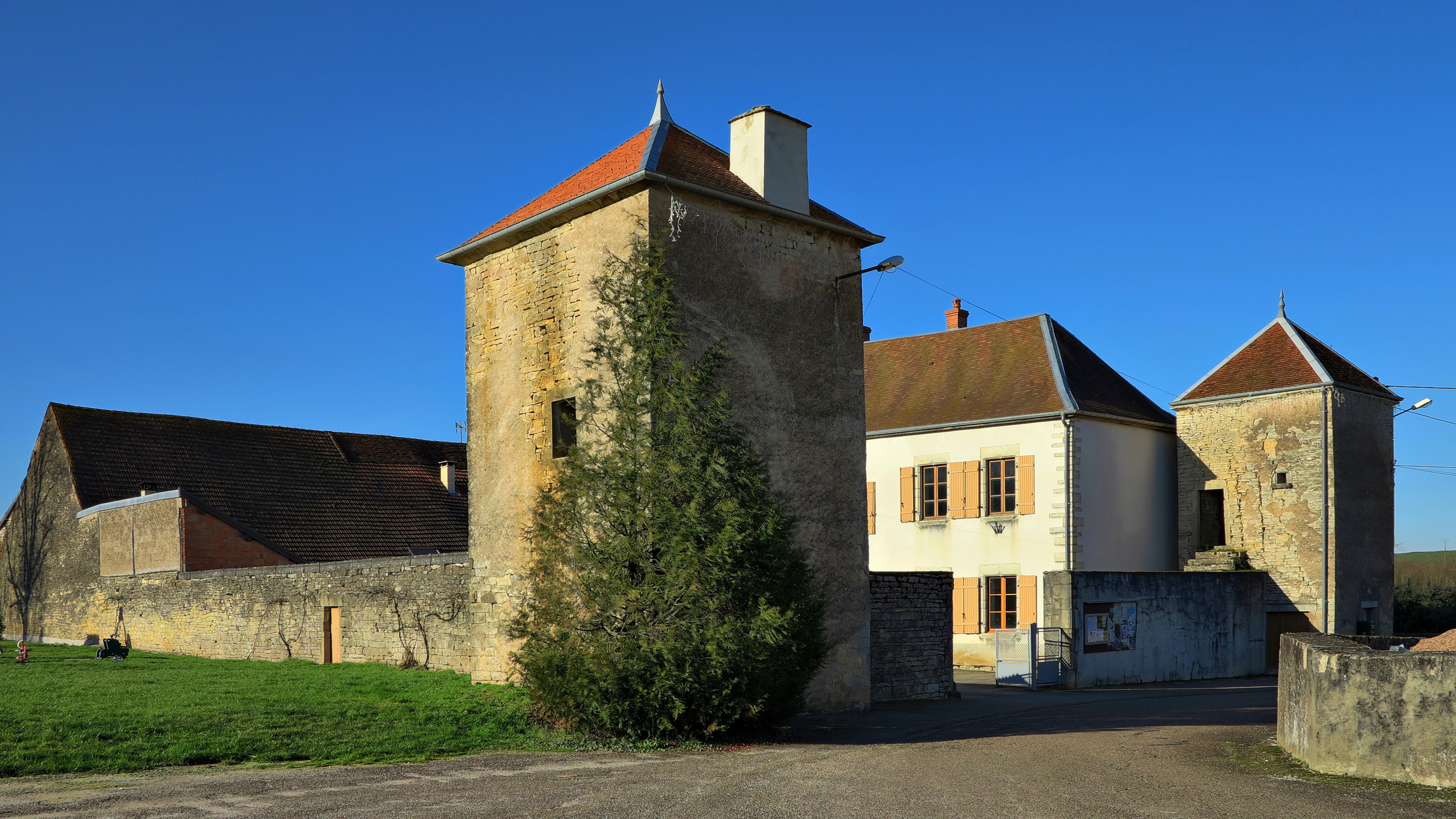
- The town hall in Cult

- Coat of arms
- Location of Cult
- Location within France Location within Bourgogne-Franche-Comté
- Coordinates: 47°18′52″N 5°44′21″E
- Country: France
- Region: Bourgogne-Franche-Comté
- Department: Haute-Saône
- Arrondissement: Vesoul
- Canton: Marnay
- Area^{1}: 6.88 km^{2} (2.66 sq mi)
- Highest elevation: 331 m (1,086 ft)
- Lowest elevation: 235 m (771 ft)
- Population (2023): 229
  - Density: 33.3/km^{2} (86.2/sq mi)
- Time zone: UTC+01:00 (CET)
  - Summer (DST): UTC+02:00 (CEST)
- INSEE/Postal code: 70193 /70150
- ^{1} French Land Register data, which excludes lakes, ponds, glaciers > 1 km^{2} (0.386 sq mi or 247 acres) and river estuaries.

Cult is a commune in the Haute-Saône department in the region of Bourgogne-Franche-Comté in eastern France.

== See also ==
- Communes of the Haute-Saône department
