= Benoît Godin =

Canadian sociologist of science and innovation

- Born: May 17, 1958
- Died: January 5, 2021; CHU de Québec, Hôtel-Dieu de Québec

Education
- Education: University of Sussex, Science Policy Research Unit SPRU (Ph.D.); Université Laval: Quebec, QC, CA, Maîtrise ès arts (Science politique)

Philosophical work
- Era: 21st-century philosophy
- Region: Western philosophy
- School: Social constructionism
- Institutions: Institut national de la recherche scientifique (INRS), CA
- Notable ideas: Role of ideology in the genesis of innovation

Benoît Godin was a Canadian political scientist and sociologist.

== Biography ==
Benoît Godin is mostly known for his research into the history of statistics, statistics of innovation, and of the ideological roots of the concept of innovation. After a first degree at the Université Laval (1984) in Québec (CA), he obtained a PhD at the Science Policy Research Unit (SPRU) the University of Sussex (UK) in 1994). From February 1993 until his death he was professor at Institut national de la recherche scientifique INRS, Québec (CA).

== Work ==
The work of Benoît Godin covers both the history of quantification and that of innovation. He worked on measurement statistics in science, on the history of science proper, as well as that of technology and innovation. In the last years of his life he focused on the intellectual history of innovation, noting how the ‘superlative’ connotation of the term innovation is recent, in relative terms, as it had a rather negative connotation until the late 1960s or early 1970s.

== Books ==
- Godin, Benoit (2020). The idea of technological innovation : a brief alternative history. Edward Elgar Publishing. Cheltenham. ISBN 978-1-83910-400-8. OCLC 1152021488.
- (As editor with Dominique Vinck) Critical Studies of Innovation: Alternative Approaches to the Pro-Innovation Bias.
- Godin, Benoit (2019). The invention of technological innovation : languages, discourses and ideology in historical perspective. Edward Elgar Publishing. Cheltenham, UK. ISBN 978-1-78990-334-8. OCLC 1125747489.
- Godin, Benoit (2017). Models of innovation : the history of an idea. Cambridge, Massachusetts. ISBN 978-0-262-33880-6. OCLC 990341355.
- Godin, Benoit (2015). Innovation contested : the idea of innovation over the centuries. New York, New York. ISBN 978-1-315-85560-8. OCLC 903958473.
- Bowker, Geoffrey C. (1 June 2007). "Benoît Godin: Measurement and Statistics on Science and Technology: 1920 to the Present". Isis. 98 (2): 403–404. doi:10.1086/521473. ISSN 0021-1753.
- Handbook on alternative theories of innovation. Benoît. Godin, Gérald Gaglio, Dominique Vinck. Cheltenham, Gloucestershire. 2021. ISBN 978-1-78990-230-3. OCLC 1285169135.

== See also ==
- Innovation
- Science and technology studies
- Social construction of technology
