= Michael Puscar =

American entrepreneur and musician

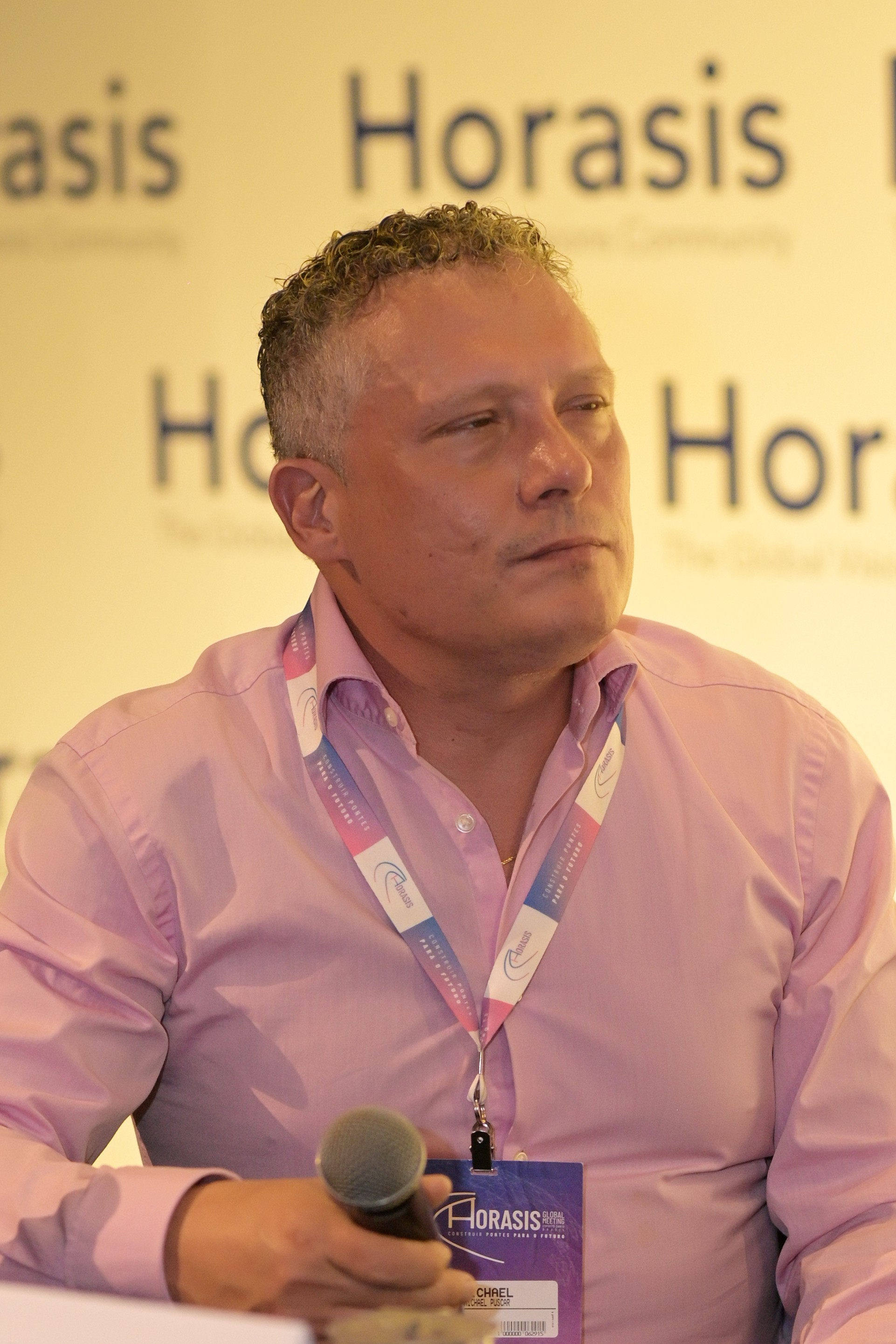
- Puscar in 2024
- Education: B.S. Temple University
- Occupations: Entrepreneur; Venture capitalist Philanthropist
- Known for: Founder of Yuxi Pacific and Oiga Technologies
- Spouse: Johana Buriticá

Michael Puscar is an entrepreneur, venture capitalist and musician. Puscar has founded several companies including Yuxi Pacific, GITP Ventures, Miguelo Romano, Oiga Technologies and NPCx, among others. He is a published data scientist and part of the business community changing the economy in Medellin, Colombia.

In 2013, Michael Puscar was a passenger on an Alitalia flight when it crash-landed at Leonardo da Vinci–Fiumicino Airport in Rome, Italy. Puscar captured video of the crash from his seat on the plane, and this video was distributed in several major media outlets.

In 2020, Puscar revisited the crash in an episode of Brains Byte Back with Sam Brake. In the podcast, Puscar stated that he thought he was going to die and that the event significantly impacted his outlook on life.

== Business ventures ==
=== Yuxi Pacific ===
In 2005, Puscar launched Yuxi Pacific, a professional services firm founded in Philadelphia, Pennsylvania and focused on the creation of digital products for the publishing industry. In 2011, Puscar brought Yuxi Pacific to Medellin, Colombia. By 2013, the company had more than 100 employees in Medellín and had quadrupled its annual revenues.

Puscar has been dubbed a hero in the "Medellin Miracle," a transformation in which the city changes its reputation from the land of violent drug cartels to a modern metropolis. While Puscar supports government backing, he believes private initiatives will ultimately lead to the rebranding of Colombia. Puscar has written about the Colombian economy. Puscar has given back to the community, donating computers to local Colombian schools.

Yuxi Pacific was acquired by Blue Loop Capital in June 2013 for an undisclosed amount of cash.

=== GITP Ventures ===
Following the acquisition of Yuxi Pacific, Puscar founded GITP Ventures, a venture capital firm based in South America. Through GITP, Puscar invested in more than 6 Colombian companies, including "Colombia Focus", "Publicize", and "IPSUM Clinical", among others. The first investment made by GITP was in software company Lex Paradigm. The company was acquired less than two years later in January 2014.

=== Miguelo Romano ===
In 2014, Puscar co-founded Miguelo Romano, the world's first and only provider of blade and bullet resistant consumer clothing that is lightweight. Puscar was interviewed by Vice Media regarding the company.

=== Other Ventures ===
In 2017, Puscar launched Oiga Technologies. Oiga is a professional services firm focused upon emerging technology. In May 2023, Oiga Technologies was acquired by 10Pearls, a move that significantly boosted high-tech software development in Colombia. This acquisition also allowed 10Pearls to expand their advanced emerging technology capabilities in the Latin America region. The acquisition marked Puscar's third successful sale of a software company in Colombia.

In 2020, Puscar co-founded and invested in NPCx, a software company using artificial intelligence to create more realistic 3D animation in video games. In August 2023, NPCx received a $3 million dollar seed round investment from Kakao Investment.

== Music and Film ==
Puscar is also a music composer and film producer whose recent works include the creation of soundtracks for various films. He has produced several short films using Artificial Intelligence technology. Puscar claims that his works were inspired by his faith.

== Personal life ==
Puscar is the son of Michael and Paula Puscar. His father, Michael Puscar Sr, was a laborer and machinist. Puscar started programming in the 1980’s at 11 years old after he convinced his parents to buy him a Commodore 64 for Christmas. Puscar has since been active in donating computers to children in poor communities in Colombia, citing the impact that his first computer had on his life.

In 2015, Puscar married Johana Buriticá, a fashion blogger from San Luis, Colombia.
