= Cult (book) =

2011 book by Arindam Chaudhuri

Cult: Leadership & Business Strategy: Ruthlessly Redefined
- Author: Arindam Chaudhuri, A. Sandeep
- Language: English
- Subject: Management
- Publisher: Vikas Publishing House
- Publication date: December 1, 2011
- Pages: 450
- ISBN: 978-1578516872
- OCLC: 770601272

Cult: Leadership & Business Strategy: Ruthlessly Redefined is a management book written by "management guru" Arindam Chaudhuri and strategy professor A. Sandeep. The book was launched by Guy Kawasaki, former Chief Evangelist at Apple Inc. and current member, Board of Trustees at the Wikimedia Foundation, in December 2011 at an event in London attended by political and business leaders, and reached the top 10 business bestsellers list in India.

The book deals with lessons for CEOs in running transnational corporations. The book is divided into two parts. The first part addresses leadership issues that CEOs face while running global corporations. The second part addresses business strategy issues that CEOs of very large corporations have to face.

Guy Kawasaki commented on the book, "I have read the book and Steve Jobs would love this book, he truly would. This book is in the same quality of Malcolm Gladwell, Geoffrey Moore & Clayton Christensen." Marshall Goldsmith said Cult provides "a view on vision you won’t find anywhere."
