= ISO 56000 family =

Family of standards for innovation management systems

ISO 56000 is a family of standards designed to provide a framework for organizations to implement, maintain and improve innovation management systems.

Document Name	Description	Link to ISO
ISO 56000:2025	Innovation management — Fundamentals and vocabulary	
ISO 56001:2024	Innovation management — Innovation management system — Requirements	
ISO 56002:2019	Innovation management — Innovation management system — Guidance	
ISO 56003:2019	Innovation management — Tools and methods for innovation partnership — Guidance	
ISO/TR 56004:2019	Innovation Management Assessment — Guidance	
ISO 56005:2020	Innovation management — Tools and methods for intellectual property management — Guidance	
ISO 56006:2021	Innovation management — Tools and methods for strategic intelligence management — Guidance	
ISO 56007:2023	Innovation management — Tools and methods for managing opportunities and ideas — Guidance	
ISO 56008:2024	Innovation management — Tools and methods for innovation operation measurements — Guidance	
ISO/TS 56010:2023	Innovation management — Illustrative examples of ISO 56000	

== See also ==
- International Standards Organization
- ISO 10006 — Quality management — Guidelines to quality management in projects
- ISO 13485 — Medical devices — Quality management systems — Requirements for regulatory purposes
- ISO 14001 — Environmental management standards
- List of ISO standards
- ISO TC 279
