= ISO/TC 279 =

ISO 56000 series — Innovation management
- Formation: 2013
- Type: Standards organization
- Purpose: Development of worldwide
- Region served: Worldwide
- Key people: Johan Claire (chair)
- Parent organization: International Organization for Standardization (ISO)
- Website: https://www.iso.org/committee/4587737.html

ISO/TC 279 is a technical committee of the International Organization for Standardization (ISO). Its purpose is to develop, maintain and promote standards in the field of innovation management.

The first plenary meeting of ISO/TC 279 was held in Paris from 4 to 5 December 2013, under the leadership of its first chairperson and founder, Alice de Casanove of Airbus Defence and Space, (mandate 2013-2021). ISO/TC279 oversees the ISO 56000 series (temporarily numbered ISO 50500 series).

== Scope and mission ==
Each published standard within the ISO 56000 series should remove lack of harmonization in the field of innovation management and allow the professionalisation of this function. Some of the standards developed in the 56000 series are strictly informational, best practice, they cannot be used as a certification basis. For innovating organizations, this series of standards can facilitate more successful collaboration, develop higher capability to innovate and bring visibility to the innovation function. Nevertheless ISO 56002 on Innovation Management System does not address specific innovation management systems such as temporary organisations (for example: startup, consortium...) however, parts can be applicable to all types of organizations.

== Members ==
ISO membership of TC 279 is open to any national standardization body. A member can be either participating (P) or observing (O), with the difference mainly being the ability to vote on proposed standards. There are 50 countries that are active participants of TC 279, and 19 observing countries. The secretariat is managed by AFNOR, located in Paris and the current chairperson is Johan Claire (mandate 2022-2024).

Other organizations can participate as Liaison Members, some of which are internal to ISO/IEC and some of which are external. The external organizations that are in liaison with TC 279 are: OECD, WIPO, WTO, CERN, World Bank, and UNIDO.

== Structure ==
Work on the development of standards is undertaken by working groups (WGs), each of which deals with a particular field.

| Working Group | Title | status |
|---|---|---|
| ISO/TC 279 / WG 1 | Innovation Management system | active |
| ISO/TC 279 / WG 2 | Terminology | active |
| ISO/TC 279 / WG 3 | Tools and methods | active |
| ISO/TC 279 / WG 4 | Assessment | withdrawn |

== Standards ==
| ISO reference | Title | Date of Publication |
|---|---|---|
| ISO 56000 | Innovation management -- Fundamentals and vocabulary | 2019 |
| ISO 56001 | Innovation management -- Innovation management system -- Requirements | September 2024 |
| ISO 56002 | Innovation management -- Innovation management system -- Guidance | July 2019 |
| ISO 56003 | Innovation management - Tools and methods for innovation partnership -- Guidance | Feb 2019 |
| ISO TR 56004 | Innovation management -- Assessment -- Guidance | Feb 2019 |
| ISO 56005 | Innovation management -- Intellectual property management -- Guidance | Nov 2020 |
| ISO 56006 | Innovation management -- Strategic intelligence management -- Guidance | Nov 2021 |
| ISO 56007 | Innovation management -- Managing ideas and opportunities -- Guidance | under development to be published in 2024 |
| ISO 56008 | Innovation management -- Innovation Operation Measurements -- Guidance | not published |
| ISO 56010 | Innovation management -- Practical Examples and Case Studies -- Guidance | not published |

== See also ==
- International Organization for Standardization
- ISO 56000
- List of ISO standards
- List of ISO Technical Committees
