= Pro-innovation bias =

Belief that innovation should be adopted by the society without the need for alterations

In diffusion of innovation theory, a pro-innovation bias is a belief that innovation should be adopted by the whole society without the need for its alteration. The innovation's "champion" has such a strong bias in favor of the innovation, that they may not see its limitations or weaknesses and continue to promote it nonetheless.

== Example ==
A feeling of nuclear optimism emerged in the 1950s in which it was believed that all power generators in the future would be atomic in nature. The atomic bomb would render all conventional explosives obsolete, and nuclear power plants would do the same for power sources such as coal and oil. There was a general feeling that everything would use a nuclear power source of some sort, in a positive and productive way, from irradiating food to preserve it to the development of nuclear medicine. There would be an age of peace and plenty in which atomic energy would "provide the power needed to desalinate water for the thirsty, irrigate the deserts for the hungry, and fuel interstellar travel deep into outer space".

Roger Smith, then chairman of General Motors, said in 1986, "By the turn of the century, we will live in a paperless society." In the late 20th century, there were many predictions of this kind.

== See also ==
- Appeal to novelty
- Gartner hype cycle
- Myth of Progress
- Status quo bias
- Technological determinism
- Wishful thinking
