= Arvind Singhal (academician) =

Indian-born American social scientist

Arvind Singhal (born 1962) is an Indian-born American social scientist and academician. His academic research has focused on diffusion of innovations, the positive deviance approach, organizing for social change, the entertainment-education strategy, and liberating interactional structures. He currently holds the positions of Samuel Shirley and Edna Holt Marston Endowed Professor of Communication and Director of the Social Justice Initiative in Department of Communication at University of Texas at El Paso since 2007, William J. Clinton Distinguished Fellow at the Clinton School of Public Service since 2010 and Distinguished Professor 2 in the Faculty of Business Administration, Inland Norway University of Applied Sciences, since 2015.

== Education and career ==
During his life in India, Singhal pursued a Bachelor of Science in mechanical engineering at University of Delhi and graduated in 1983. After moving to the United States, he earned his first Master of Arts (M.A.) in Radio-Film-TV at Bowling Green State University, Ohio in 1985. Eventually, Singhal enrolled at Annenberg School for Communication at University of Southern California, Los Angeles, where he earned his second Master of Arts in communication theory and research (1989) and Ph.D. in communication theory and research (1990).

Singhal began his teaching career as a lecturer in Department of Communication Studies, California State University, Los Angeles in 1989. He subsequently taught at multiple institutions such as University of California, Los Angeles (1990), Ohio University (multiple appointments between 1991 and 2007), University of Southern California (1995 to 2000) and Chemnitz University of Technology (2009). He also served as visiting faculty on multiple institutions globally during the period. In 2007, he was appointed as the Samuel Shirley and Edna Holt Marston Endowed Professor of Communication and Director of Social Justice Initiative at University of Texas at El Paso. In 2010, he became a William J. Clinton Distinguished Fellow, Clinton School of Public Service, University of Arkansas at Little Rock, Arkansas. In 2015, he was also named Distinguished Professor 2 at the Faculty of Business Administration, Inland Norway University of Applied Sciences and Presidential Scholar at Mudra Institute of Communication Arts (MICA), Ahmedabad, India. Over his career, Singhal also took upon many projects as consultant for international organizations such as UNICEF, World Bank, several national and regional governments and private corporations.

== Major contributions ==
=== Diffusion of innovations ===
During his years at Annenberg School of Communication at University of Southern California, Singhal worked extensively with the communication theorist Everett Rogers, who was also his mentor. Rogers was renowned for his work on the theory of diffusion of innovations, which dictated that:

Representation of diffusion of innovations model by Rogers. (illustrated).

"Adopters of any new innovation or idea can be categorized as innovators (2.5%), early adopters (13.5%), early majority (34%), late majority (34%) and laggards (16%), based on the mathematically based Bell curve. When graphed, the rate of adoption formed what came to typify the Diffusion of Innovations model, a logistic curve. The graph shows a cumulative percentage of adopters over time–slow at the start, more rapid as adoption increases, then levelling off until only a small percentage of laggards have not adopted."

Singhal defines diffusion as "the process by which an innovation is filtered through certain channels over time among the members of a social system." and innovation as "an idea, practice, or object perceived as new by an individual or other unit of adoption." Collectively he treats diffusion of innovations as a communications process as no diffusion is possible without dissemination of information amongst the individuals. He argued that while the theory was not an ideology, it was construed ideologically analogous to the "trickle-down" approach in economics. The theory in Singhal's opinion does not want one "to wait" for diffusion of a new innovation to reach the poorest of the poor (often regarded as late adopters), and believes that the rate of adoption by any segment can be accelerated using communication and outreach strategies. He also argues for 'decentralized diffusion' (a process where diffusion of any product or practice is propagated by multiple actors) as one of the strategies to achieve this end.

=== Positive deviance (PD) approach ===
Singhal's main contribution lies in the adoption of positive deviance (or PD) approach to research. He argues that solutions to complex social problems exist in the communities as some type of tacit knowledge but are hidden from plain view, and PD approach comes in handy in identifying the tacit knowledge and expanding its prevalence within the community. The PD approach identifies individuals within communities and groups whose uncommon behaviours and strategies enable them find better solutions to the problems experienced by the community, considering that these individuals ought to have the same resources as their peers. These individuals are identified as 'positive outliers' or 'positive deviants' when their traits are unusually better compared to their peers in the same group characterized by similar socio-economic parameters. For instance, a particular child recorded an unusually good body-mass index in a community of malnourished children where all of them live in similar socio-economic conditions and the child in question has no identifiable privileges than distinguishes the child from others in its category.

Singhal explains that PD approach consists of four stages:

1. Awareness and breakout of the community "mental prisons". 'Mental prisons' are preconceived notions, biases and even practices that prevent the researchers and the communities from identifying solutions that might in plain sight.
2. Identifying the positive deviants - the carriers of the authentic experience and valuable tacit knowledge. Some members of the community are able to exhibit superior traits than their peers even when they are subject to the same socio-economic conditions. The researchers ought to identify what these positive deviants are doing differently with their resources that make them exhibit traits that are uncommon for their group.
3. Creation of particular methods to facilitate the "paradigm shift". Once the practices of positive deviants are identified, their methods ought to be disseminated to the rest of the community to allow for a 'paradigm shift' for the community and for adoption of the said practices in their daily lives.
4. Community members embrace the new practice, spurred by the self-discovery and social proof. The community adopts the practices of the positive deviants and their traits improve reasonably. The researchers measure the impact of the adopted practices.

Many of Singhal's written works advocate for expansion of PD approach in addressing issues of public health, malnutrition, social behaviours and education. Singhal notes that PD has been used to address issues such as malnutrition, eradication of female genital mutilation, human trafficking, increasing school retention rates, and promoting use of condoms among commercial sex workers.

=== Liberating interactional structures ===
Singhal's work advocates that learning and communication can be made more accessible by incorporating the Liberating Structures model, which consists of simple protocols of reorganizing classrooms through different spatial arrangements, group configurations, distribution of participation, and sequencing of steps. Classrooms that incorporate the model allow for equitable student participation, peer-learning, and building of connections, trust, and immediacy. The teacher in such a classroom only assumes the role of facilitator instead of a lecturer and helps the group in exploring solutions. Although, liberating structures are not limited to classroom settings. Singhal also conducted multiple workshops to incorporate liberating structures in other sectors, such as healthcare.

=== Entertainment-education strategy ===
Singhal also advocates for a theory-based communication strategy to facilitate learning called Entertainment-Education (E-E), he claims is a purposeful embedding of educational and social issues in entertainment programs or products to achieve social-behavioural change in any given society. An E-E strategy is directed at an intended media user population, comprising audiences of mass media products (newspapers, films, television, and radio) and/or consumers of games and virtual environments. Singhal's approach to E-E theory is based on works of Albert Bandura, specifically, the social learning theory and social cognitive theory.

Singhal's work in E-E has investigated the dimensions of paradoxes, contradictions, and audience members' struggles in the process of media-stimulated change, a process involving parasocial interaction, peer communication, and collective efficacy. He notes that E-E has been successfully incorporated in hundreds of social change projects and as a field of communication research and practice, E-E "...continues to make richer, deeper, and wider connections with other social science and humanistic disciplines."

== Works ==
Singhal has worked on several books, articles and funded research projects. He authored upwards of 170 peer-reviewed articles in journals such as the Journal of Communication, Communication Theory, Communication Monographs, Health Communication, Management Communication Quarterly; Communication Quarterly, Journal of Broadcasting & Electronic Media, Journal of Health Communication etc.

=== Books ===
- Arvind Singhal and Everett M. Rogers (1989). India's Information Revolution. Thousand Oaks, CA: Sage. ISBN 978-0803996175
- Arvind Singhal and Everett M. Rogers (1999). Entertainment-Education: A Communication Strategy for Social Change. Mahwah, NJ: Lawrence Erlbaum Associates. ISBN 1135669422, ISBN 9781135669423
- Arvind Singhal and Everett M. Rogers (2001). India's Communication Revolution: From Bullock Carts to Cyber Marts. Thousand Oaks, CA: Sage. ISBN 0761994718, ISBN 9780761994718
- Arvind Singhal and W. Stephen Howard (Editors) (2003). The Children of Africa Confront AIDS: From Vulnerability to Possibility. Athens, OH: Ohio University Press. ISBN 0896802329, ISBN 9780896802322
- Arvind Singhal and Everett M. Rogers (2003). Combating AIDS: Communication Strategies in Action. Thousand Oaks, CA: Sage. ISBN 0761997288, ISBN 9780761997283
- Arvind Singhal, Mike Cody, Everett M. Rogers, and Miguel Sabido (Editors) (2004). Entertainment- Education Worldwide: History, Research, and Practice. Mahwah, NJ: Lawrence Erlbaum Associates. ISBN 1135624569, ISBN 9781135624569
- Michael J. Papa, Arvind Singhal, and Wendy Papa (2006). Organizing for Social Change: A Dialectical Journey of Theory and Praxis. Sage Publications: Thousand Oaks, CA; London, and New Delhi. ISBN 9351501361, ISBN 9789351501367
- Arvind Singhal and James W. Dearing (Eds.) (2006). Communication of Innovations: A Journey with Ev Rogers. Sage Publications: Thousand Oaks, CA; London, and New Delhi. ISBN 0761934766, ISBN 9780761934769
- Virginia Lacayo and Arvind Singhal (2008). Popular Culture with a Purpose! Using Edutainment Media for Social Change. Den Haag, Netherlands: Oxfam-Novib. Ebook available here.
- Arvind Singhal and Lucia Dura (2009). Protecting Children from Exploitation and Trafficking: Using the Positive Deviance Approach in Uganda and Indonesia. Washington D.C.: Save the Children. ISBN 0615311415, ISBN 9780615311418
- Arvind Singhal, Prucia Buscell, and Curt Lindberg (2010). Inviting Everyone: Healing Healthcare through Positive Deviance. Bordentown, NJ: PlexusPress. ISBN 1453731644, ISBN 9781453731642
- Do Kyun Kim, Arvind Singhal, and Gary Kreps (Eds.) (2014). Health Communication: Strategies for Developing Global Health Programs. New York, NY: Peter Lang Publishers. ISBN 1433118645, ISBN 9781433118647
- Arvind Singhal, Prucia Buscell, and Curt Lindberg (2014). Inspiring Change and Saving Lives: The Positive Deviance Way. Bordentown, NJ: PlexusPress. ISBN 0692271651, ISBN 9780692271650

== See also ==
- Diffusion of innovations
- Positive deviance
- Everett Rogers
- Communication for social change
