= Cultural contracts =

Theory about the ways identities are negotiated through cross-cultural interaction

Cultural contracts refer to the degree that cultural values are exchanged between groups. They are the agreements made between two groups of people regarding how they will modify their identities in unison. Cultural contract theory investigates how identities shift and are negotiated through cross-cultural interaction. It extends identity negotiation theory and uncertainty reduction theory by focusing defining the negotiation experience from the perspective of minority groups when dealing with cultural norms set by the majority groups. Relationally coordinating with others is the main objective of a cultural contract. The three fundamental premises of the cultural contracts theory are that identities are contractual, continually transferred, and requirement for validation.

Cultural contracts theory was developed in 1999 by Dr. Ronald L. Jackson, an identity scholar and a professor in media and cinema studies at the University of Illinois at Urbana–Champaign.

== Background ==
Cultural contracts first appeared in Communication Quarterly in 1999. Dr. Ronald L. Jackson came up with the original idea while negotiating a deal for a new house. He was fascinated by the general outline of a contract and was interested in identity as a communication researcher, so the process struck a chord with him and made him think about how cultural diversity functions in our society.

The theory is inspired by Ting-Toomey's (1986) identity validation model (IDM) that emerged from a study of European American and African American communication experiences. Both theories are rooted in the exchanges between strangers as described in Berger and Calabrese's (1975) uncertainty reduction theory. Cultural contracts focuses specifically on the exchanges between traditionally marginalized groups and majority groups in power in American society from the standpoint of the minority member.

The theory is not limited to oral communication, and also include nonverbal communications such as clothing, hairstyle, and other items. Any value that makes up an individual's worldview, including behavior and other cultural norms, can be negotiated and subjected to a cultural contract. For humans, culture is a fundamental and essential component. Cultural contracts are required for people to protect and define their identity. Contracts can be long-lasting (like when individuals of marginalized groups want to fit in with American society.) or transient(similar to how someone might speak in a more professional tone when trying to impress others). People can simultaneously negotiate several identities when engaging in interactions. In other words, it is conceivable for one individual to have multiple cultural contracts with various parties for various objectives. In the negotiation, power is a key factor. The group with less power must choose whether or not to enter into a contract with the dominant group.

Contract violations have three possible outcomes: ending the relationship, renegotiating the contract, or nothing if the harm is slight or the relationship is crucial.

== Types of contracts ==
Cultural contract types
Ready-to-Sign
Quasi-Complete
Co-Created

Cultural contracts suggests that mainstream and marginalized identities are in natural conflict. In order to achieve communication, individuals must decide how much of their values will be negotiated. This results in one of three contracts by the minority identity: ready-to-sign contracts (assimilating to mainstream values); quasi-completed contracts (adapting marginalized values to accommodate mainstream values); and co-created contracts (validating both mainstream and marginalized values). Most individuals are not aware that they create or sign cultural contracts. Each contract is a "result of how identities have been personally and socially constructed and exposed."

=== Ready-to-sign contract ===
The first contract is a ready-to-sign contract, or assimilation, which occurs when individuals replace their culture identity for the dominant culture. This contract can be temporary or long-term and benefits the majority. There is no room for negotiating marginalized identity with mainstream ideals in this contract with no perceived benefit to the marginalized group. The signing of contract is driven by the desire to maintain an artificial harmony or to accomplish specific goals.

Ready-to-sign contracts are typically the product of power and culture loyalty. In any given society, those in positions of power frequently keep ready-to-sign contracts. "Dominant group members' fears" can cause the majority group to hold ready-to-sign cultural contracts about the minority group with little room for negotiation. Resisting assimilation can be dangerous and frequently tiring for the minority groups. They not only manage the numerous challenges and strains that the majority group may confront, but also the cultural isolation that results from being cut off from the community.

=== Quasi-completed contracts ===
Quasi-completed contracts (adaptation) result in temporarily incorporating a small part of an individual's value to the mainstream value, and vice versa. This is usually a short-term contract since neither identity is dominant in this interaction. Quasi-completed contracts are created to strike a balance between upholding current identities and attempting to connect with other communities. Avoiding conflicts, developing cultural pride, or raising cultural awareness are the driving forces behind it.

=== Co-created contracts ===
Lastly, co-created contracts (mutual validation) result in blending values together. Cultural differences are acknowledged and valued in this contract. In certain instance, values are deeply penetrated and are not up for exchange. Others are more surface and the perceived benefits of the contract do not conflict with our core identity. This will determine if an individual is willing to sign a cultural contract or remain in conflict.

The signing of contract is driven by actually coming to esteem the other individual, demonstrating one's allyship, or fending off marginalization. The contracts can be signed one or two ways: the signee perceives a benefit in accommodating or assimilating, or the signee is forced to accommodate or assimilate. Members of marginalized groups are more likely to look for co-created cultural contracts. Co-created contracts are also desired by those who identify as multicultural. This promotes the release of emotional, interpersonal, psychological, and personal burden while enabling the highest level of trust and openness.

=== The transformation among different types of contracts ===
During the COVID-19 pandemic, disabled students changed how they negotiated their identities in the classrooms. Researchers found that some instructors relaxed strict standards of what constitutes "perfect" student engagement, substituting ready-to-sign contracts for quasi-complete and co-created ones. This was motivated by the uncertainty of pandemic life. However, the researchers also voice concerns about teachers reverting to the earlier expectations once the pre-COVID classroom settings resume.

A 2015 study that focused on the Ice Bucket Challenge discovered that if one party in the identity negotiation wants to end the relationship, there can be a shift from a quasi-completed contract to a ready-to-sign contract, where this party changed from being open to discussion to taking control and making decisions that cannot be challenged. But for the time being, neither party's choice will be influenced by popular opinion.

== Applications ==
=== In identity studies ===
A transient must renegotiate both "culture contract" and reintegration into country of origin. Cultural contracts are traded and implicitly controlled during the multiple reentry process. A period of absence from home may necessitate some adjusting to changes because values, attitudes, norms, communication patterns, and perspectives on the world are subject to change with time. The "signing" of a cultural contract occurs when any one or all of these dimensions of identity change.

=== In rhetoric studies ===
Everyday rhetorical transmission, public property, historical context, and social ties are all characteristics of culture. Every negotiation is a rhetorical one because people are actually negotiating to keep access to a cultural collective or rhetorical community rather than giving that access away. In order to understand how communicators' identities are impacted by typical rhetorical transactions, paradigms like the cultural contracts theory need to be developed. For investigating how relationships and identities are created, managed, rejected, or terminated, as well as how this process occurs rhetorically, the paradigm of cultural contracts is also helpful.

=== In racial and gender studies ===
Cultural contracts theory has been used in higher education scholarship to explore the relationships between White students and African American faculty. The theory has also been used to explore the contracts African American women sign in their beauty and hair choices.

The notion of cultural contracts has provided an effective framework for investigating how biracial young adults position themselves within current U.S. conceptions of race. In part, study participants described how traditional racial categorizations affected how they developed their sense of identity. Most multiracial women renegotiate their identities through quasi-completed cultural contracts. Although some of the multiracial women were successful in fostering co-created cultural contracts, doing so seems to be an ongoing challenge. The multiracial women who managed co-created contracts in their daily lives appeared to be particularly concerned with bucking "mainstream thinking," which manifested itself in a variety of ready-to-sign cultural contracts.

=== In the classroom ===
A study discovered that parents from different racial origins have diverse ideas on what constitutes a good education and how important education is. Interracial couples have the advantage of diverse viewpoints and exhibit a willingness to have quasi-completed and co-created cultural contracts with their spouses when negotiating the educational options for their children.

=== In the hospital ===
The theory is applied to research how Saudi nurses negotiate their identities at work. The hospital administration disregarded the female nurses demands and rigidly insisted that the nurses perform their responsibilities without exceptions even after they protested to delivering duties involving male genitalia. In this phase, the nurses had ready-to-sign contracts with the administration. However, the nurses fought the administration's directives on several levels and signed the quasi-complete contracts. Some nurses signed the co-created contracts when they do not think that their work violate their values and norms as Saudi women. For example, a nurse had appealed to the importance of assistance which is one of the basic Islamic teachings.
