= Democratization (disambiguation) =

Democratization is the process by which political systems become more democratic. It may also refer to:

- Waves of democracy
- Demokratizatsiya (disambiguation)
- Democratization of energy
- Democratization of knowledge
- Democratization of technology
