= Shifted Gompertz distribution =

Probability distribution

Shifted Gompertz
- Probability density function

- Cumulative distribution function
- Parameters: $b \geq 0$ scale (real) $\eta\geq 0$ shape (real)
- Support: $x \in [0, \infty)\!$
- PDF: $b e^{-bx} e^{-\eta e^{-bx}}\left[1 + \eta\left(1 - e^{-bx}\right)\right]$
- CDF: $\left(1 - e^{-bx}\right)e^{-\eta e^{-bx}}$
- Mean: $(-1/b)\{\mathrm{E}[\ln(X)] - \ln(\eta)\}\,$ where $X = \eta e^{-bx}\,$ and $$\begin{align}\mathrm{E}[\ln(X)] =& [1 {+} 1 / \eta]\!\!\int_0^\eta \!\!\!\! e^{-X}[\ln(X)]dX\\ &- 1/\eta\!\! \int_0^\eta \!\!\!\! X e^{-X}[\ln(X)] dX \end{align}$$
- Mode: $0 \text{ for }0 < \eta \leq 0.5$ $(-1/b)\ln(z^\star)\text{, for } \eta > 0.5$ $\text{ where }z^\star = [3 + \eta - (\eta^2 + 2\eta + 5)^{1/2}]/(2\eta)$
- Variance: $(1/b^2)(\mathrm{E}\{[\ln(X)]^2\} - (\mathrm{E}[\ln(X)])^2)\,$ where $X = \eta e^{-bx}\,$ and $$\begin{align}\mathrm{E}\{[\ln(X)]^2\} =& [1 {+} 1 / \eta]\!\!\int_0^\eta \!\!\!\! e^{-X}[\ln(X)]^2 dX\\ &- 1/\eta \!\!\int_0^\eta \!\!\!\! X e^{-X}[\ln(X)]^2 dX \end{align}$$

The shifted Gompertz distribution is the distribution of the larger of two independent random variables one of which has an exponential distribution with parameter $b$ and the other has a Gumbel distribution with parameters $\eta$ and $b$. In its original formulation the distribution was expressed referring to the Gompertz distribution instead of the Gumbel distribution but, since the Gompertz distribution is a reverted Gumbel distribution, the labelling can be considered as accurate. It has been used as a model of adoption of innovations. It was proposed by Bemmaor (1994). Some of its statistical properties have been studied further by Jiménez and Jodrá (2009) and Jiménez Torres (2014).

It has been used to predict the growth and decline of social networks and on-line services and shown to be superior to the Bass model and Weibull distribution (Bauckhage and Kersting 2014).

== Specification ==
=== Probability density function ===
The probability density function of the shifted Gompertz distribution is:

$$f(x;b,\eta) = b e^{-bx} e^{-\eta e^{-bx}}\left[1 + \eta\left(1 - e^{-bx}\right)\right] \text{ for }x \geq 0. \,$$

where $b \geq 0$ is a scale parameter and $\eta \geq 0$ is a shape parameter. In the context of diffusion of innovations, $b$ can be interpreted as the overall appeal of the innovation and $\eta$ is the propensity to adopt in the propensity-to-adopt paradigm. The larger $b$ is, the stronger the appeal and the larger $\eta$ is, the smaller the propensity to adopt.

The distribution can be reparametrized according to the external versus internal influence paradigm with $p = f(0;b,\eta) = be^{-\eta }$ as the coefficient of external influence and $q = b - p$ as the coefficient of internal influence. Hence:

$$f(x;p,q) = (p + q) e^{-(p + q)x} e^{-\ln(1 + q/p) e^{-(p+q)x}}\left[1 + \ln(1 + q/p)\left(1 - e^{-(p + q)x}\right)\right] \text{ for }x \geq 0, p, q \geq 0. \,$$
$$= (p + q) e^{-(p + q)x} {(1 + q/p)^{-e^{-(p+q)x}}}\left[1 + \ln(1 + q/p)\left(1 - e^{-(p + q)x}\right)\right] \text{ for }x \geq 0, p, q \geq 0. \,$$

When $q = 0$, the shifted Gompertz distribution reduces to an exponential distribution. When $p = 0$, the proportion of adopters is nil: the innovation is a complete failure. The shape parameter of the probability density function is equal to $q/p$. Similar to the Bass model, the hazard rate $z(x;p,q)$ is equal to $p$ when $x$ is equal to $0$; it approaches $p + q$ as $x$ gets close to $\infty$. See Bemmaor and Zheng for further analysis.

=== Cumulative distribution function ===
The cumulative distribution function of the shifted Gompertz distribution is:

$$F(x;b,\eta) = \left(1 - e^{-bx}\right)e^{-\eta e^{-bx}} \text{ for }x \geq 0. \,$$

Equivalently,

$$F(x;p, q) = \left(1 - e^{-(p + q)x}\right)e^{-\ln(1 + q/p)e^{-(p+q)x}} \text{ for }x \geq 0. \,$$
$$= \left(1 - e^{-(p + q)x}\right){(1 + q/p)^{-e^{-(p+q)x}}} \text{ for }x \geq 0. \,$$

== Properties ==
The shifted Gompertz distribution is right-skewed for all values of $\eta$. It is more flexible than the Gumbel distribution. The hazard rate is a concave function of $F(x;b,\eta)$ which increases from $be^{-\eta}$ to $b$: its curvature is all the steeper as $\eta$ is large. In the context of the diffusion of innovations, the effect of word of mouth (i.e., the previous adopters) on the likelihood to adopt decreases as the proportion of adopters increases. (For comparison, in the Bass model, the effect remains the same over time). The parameter $q = b(1-e^{-\eta})$ captures the growth of the hazard rate when $x$ varies from $0$ to $\infty$.

=== Shapes ===
The shifted Gompertz density function can take on different shapes depending on the values of the shape parameter $\eta$:

- $0 < \eta \leq 0.5\,$ the probability density function has its mode at 0.
- $\eta > 0.5\,$ the probability density function has its mode at

$$\text{mode}=-\frac{\ln(z^\star)}{b}\, \qquad 0 < z^\star < 1$$

where $z^\star\,$ is the smallest root of

$$\eta^2z^2 - \eta(3 + \eta)z + \eta + 1 = 0\,,$$

which is

$$z^\star = [3 + \eta - (\eta^2 + 2\eta + 5)^{1/2}]/(2\eta).$$

== Related distributions ==
When $\eta$ varies according to a gamma distribution with shape parameter $\alpha$ and scale parameter $\beta$ (mean = $\alpha\beta$), the distribution of $x$ is Gamma/Shifted Gompertz (G/SG). When $\alpha$ is equal to one, the G/SG reduces to the Bass model (Bemmaor 1994). The three-parameter G/SG has been applied by Dover, Goldenberg and Shapira (2009) and Van den Bulte and Stremersch (2004) among others in the context of the diffusion of innovations. The model is discussed in Chandrasekaran and Tellis (2007). Similar to the shifted Gompertz distribution, the G/SG can either be represented according to the propensity-to-adopt paradigm or according to the innovation-imitation paradigm. In the latter case, it includes three parameters: $p, q$ and $\alpha$ with $p = f(0;b,\beta, \alpha) = b/(1+\beta)^{\alpha }$ and $q = b - p$. The parameter $\alpha$ modifies the curvature of the hazard rate as expressed as a function of $F(x;p,q, \alpha)$: when $\alpha$ is less than 0.5, it decreases to a minimum prior to increasing at an increasing rate as $F(x;p,q, \alpha < 1/2)$ increases, it is convex when $\alpha$ is less than one and larger or equal to 0.5, linear when $\alpha$ is equal to one, and concave when $\alpha$ is larger than one. Here are some special cases of the G/SG distribution in the case of homogeneity (across the population) with respect to the likelihood to adopt at a given time:

                        
  
    
      
        F
        (
        x
        ;
        p
        ,
        q
        ,
        α
        =
        0
        )
      
    
    {\displaystyle F(x;p,q,\alpha =0)}
  
 = Exponential
  
    
      
        (
        p
        +
        q
        )
      
    
    {\displaystyle (p+q)}
  

                        
  
    
      
        F
        (
        x
        ;
        p
        ,
        q
        ,
        α
        =
        1
        
          /
        
        2
        )
      
    
    {\displaystyle F(x;p,q,\alpha =1/2)}
  
 = Left-skewed two-parameter distribution
  
    
      
        (
        p
        ,
        q
        )
      
    
    {\displaystyle (p,q)}
  

                        
  
    
      
        F
        (
        x
        ;
        p
        ,
        q
        ,
        α
        =
        1
        )
      
    
    {\displaystyle F(x;p,q,\alpha =1)}
  
  = Bass model
  
    
      
        (
        p
        ,
        q
        )
      
    
    {\displaystyle (p,q)}
  

                        
  
    
      
        F
        (
        x
        ;
        p
        ,
        q
        ,
        α
        =
        ∞
        )
      
    
    {\displaystyle F(x;p,q,\alpha =\infty )}
  
 = Shifted Gompertz
  
    
      
        (
        p
        ,
        q
        )
      
    
    {\displaystyle (p,q)}
  

with:

              
  
    
      
        F
        (
        x
        ;
        p
        ,
        q
        ,
        α
        =
        1
        
          /
        
        2
        )
        =
        
          (
          
            1
            −
            
              e
              
                −
                (
                p
                +
                q
                )
                x
              
            
          
          )
        
        
          /
        
        
          (
          1
          +
          (
          q
          
            /
          
          p
          )
          (
          2
          +
          q
          
            /
          
          p
          )
          
            e
            
              −
              (
              p
              +
              q
              )
              x
            
          
          
            )
            
              1
              
                /
              
              2
            
          
        
        
           for 
        
        x
        ≥
        0
        ,
        p
        ,
        q
        ≥
        0.
        
      
    
    {\displaystyle F(x;p,q,\alpha =1/2)=\left(1-e^{-(p+q)x}\right)/{(1+(q/p)(2+q/p)e^{-(p+q)x})^{1/2}}{\text{ for }}x\geq 0,p,q\geq 0.\,}
  

One can compare the parameters $p$ and $q$ across the values of $\alpha$ as they capture the same notions. In all the cases, the hazard rate is either constant or a monotonically increasing function of $F(x;p,q, \alpha)$ (positive word of mouth). As the diffusion curve is all the more skewed as $\alpha$ becomes large, we expect $q$ to decrease as the level of right-skew increases.

== See also ==
- Gumbel distribution
- Generalized extreme value distribution
- Mixture model
- Bass model
- Gompertz distribution
