= OldVersion.com =

Archive website for old version of software

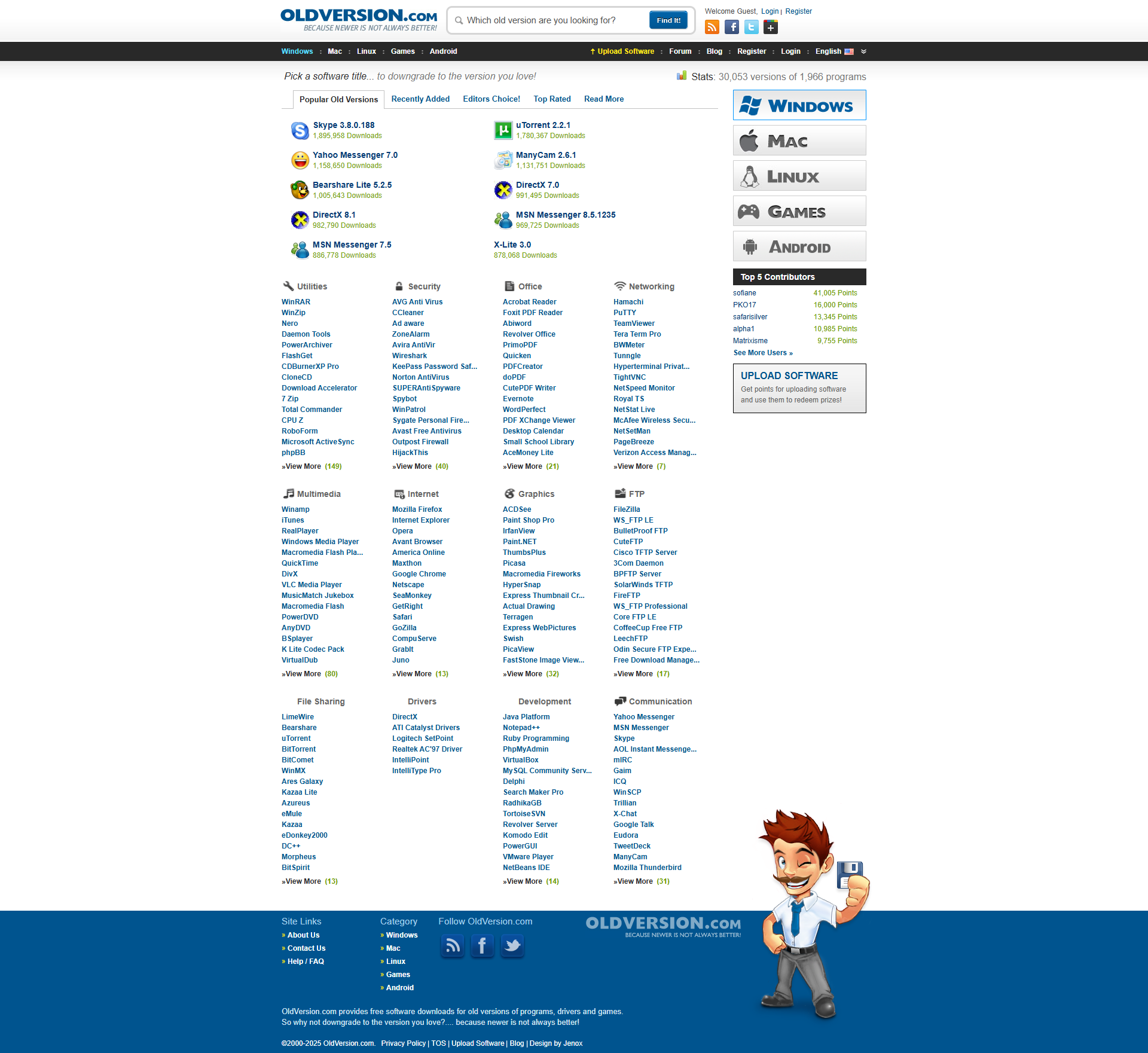
- OldVersion.com Homepage 1 April 2025
- Website type: Freeware/shareware archive of old software versions
- Available in: English
- Creators: Alex Levine, Igor Dolgalev
- Website: www.oldversion.com
- Registration: Optional (to post on forum).
- Launched: May 31, 2001; 25 years ago
- Current status: Up

OldVersion.com is an archive website that stores and distributes older versions of primarily Internet-related IBM PC compatible and Apple Macintosh freeware and shareware application software. Alex Levine and Igor Dolgalev founded the site in 2001.

Levine created the site because "Companies make a lot of new versions. They're not always better for the consumer." As reported in The Wall Street Journal, 'Users often try to downgrade when they find confusing changes in a new version or encounter software bugs, or just decide they want to go back to a more familiar version,' said David Smith, an analyst at research firm Gartner. 'Often, they discover that the downgrade process is complicated, if not impossible.'

When OldVersion.com was launched it offered 80 versions of 14 programs.

By 2005, over 500 versions were posted.

By 28 August 2007, this had grown to 2388 versions of 179 programs, in categories such as "graphics", "file-sharing", "security" and "enterprise". The site also carries 600+ versions of 35 Macintosh programs.

In 2007, PC World labeled the site "a treasure trove ... of older-but-better software";

In 2005, National Review called OldVersion.com a "champion" for "software conservatives".

According to Alexander Levine's own words, he has received threats from proprietary software developers for distributing old versions of web browsers, in particular, Internet Explorer which is difficult to support.

Around October 2025, the website was stripped of its Google Ad revenue and currently relies on community donations to continue operations. The earliest recorded instance of the banner stating a cut from ad revenue is from the 7th October.

== See also ==
- Abandonware
- Legacy code
- Planned obsolescence
- Technology acceptance model
- Switching barriers
