= Emplify =

American employee engagement SaaS company

Emplify, Inc.
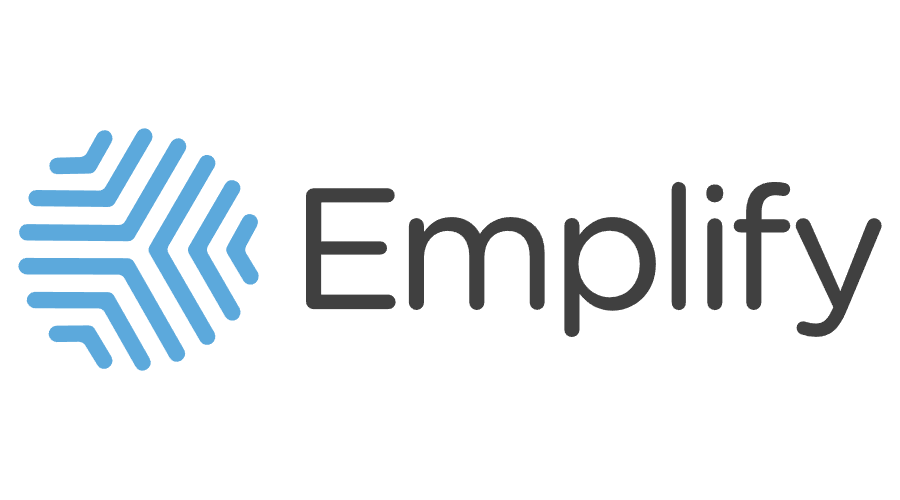
- Formerly: Bluebridge Digital., Inc.
- Type: Private Company
- Industry: Software as a Service
- Founded: 2011; 15 years ago
- Founder: Santiago Jaramillo; Adam Weber
- Headquarters: Fishers, Indiana, US
- Number of locations: 1
- Area served: United States
- Key people: Santiago Jaramillo(CEO); Adam Weber(CPO); Kurt Phillips(CFO)
- Products: Employee Engagement Measurement; Computer Software; Software as a Service
- Brands: Insights; SmartPulse
- Number of employees: 51 (2020)
- Website: emplify.com

Emplify, Inc. was a Fishers, Indiana–based privately held Software-as-a-Service (SaaS) company with headquarters in the Nickel Plate District. Its employee engagement software provides employees with a platform to voice feedback to company executives through quarterly, confidential surveys.

Emplify was first introduced as a product line by Bluebridge Digital., Inc. in February 2016. However, upon the sale of Bluebridge's mobile app business in November 2016, the company shifted their focus to employee engagement and adopted the Emplify name as its own.

Emplify was acquired by 15Five of San Francisco, California, for $50 million.

== History ==
Bluebridge Digital., Inc. logo, predecessor to Emplify, Inc.

Bluebridge Digital, Inc., known as Bluebridge, was founded in 2011 by Santiago Jaramillo out of his college dorm room. The company began as a mobile app platform for churches and tourism organizations built on a proprietary common code base.

In February 2016, Bluebridge acquired Cadence Consulting, which became the initial network of early adopters for the employee engagement sector of the business. As part of the acquisition, Bluebridge also hired Todd Richardson, Cadence Consulting founder and former ExactTarget executive, as their Chief People Officer.

Around this same time, Bluebridge introduced Emplify, which was originally developed for internal company use, as a new product line after employee engagement accounted for more than half of new sales for the company. The launch was boosted with a $3 million round of funding by Midwestern venture capital firms Allos Ventures and Cultivation Capita.

In November 2016, Bluebridge sold its Bluebridge Churches unit to echurch powered by PushPay, a mobile giving and engagement technology provider for faith-based organizations, and sold its Bluebridge Tourism unit to Simpleview, which provides sales and marketing technology. This sale marked as the official transition from Bluebridge Digital., Inc. to Emplify, Inc.

In September 2018, Emplify announced that it had raised a $7.5 million in a Series A investment round for its employee engagement platform. The round was led by New Jersey–based growth equity investment firm Edison Partners, with participation again from Allos Ventures and Cultivation Capita. With this round of funding, Emplify also announced the roll-out of a new Emplify Partner Program with select talent management and consulting firms.

In October 2019, Edison Partners doubled down on their investment into Emplify when the two announced they had completed a $15 million Series B investment round. The round was again aided by investors Allos Ventures and Cultivation Capita. Emplify announced that this round of funding would allow the company to continue product development and expand its sales and marketing teams. As part of the announcement, Emplify also revealed that it had grown year-over-year revenue by an average of more than 275% since its founding in 2016.
