= Technology readiness =

People's attitude to new technology

Technology readiness refers to people's propensity to embrace and use new technologies for accomplishing goals in home life and at work. The construct can be viewed as an overall state of mind resulting from a gestalt of mental enablers and inhibitors that collectively determine a person's predisposition to use new technologies.

The Technology Readiness Index (TRI), introduced by A. Parasuraman in 2000, consists of 36 attributes that measure the construct and its components. A streamlined and updated version with 16 attributes, "TRI 2.0," was introduced by Parasuraman and Colby in 2015. The Technology Readiness model differs from well-known acceptance models such as the Technology acceptance model (TAM) in that TRI measures beliefs an individual has about cutting-edge technology in general while the TAM model measures acceptance towards a specific technology. Technology Readiness is a multidimensional psychographic construct, offering a way to segment consumers based upon their underlying positive and negative technology beliefs.

Technology readiness has four underlying dimensions:

- optimism, a positive view of technology and a belief that it offers people increased control, flexibility, and efficiency
- innovativeness, the tendency to be a technology pioneer and thought leader
- discomfort, perceived lack of control over technology and a feeling of being overwhelmed by it
- insecurity, distrust of technology and skepticism about its ability to work properly.

While optimism and innovativeness are contributors to technology readiness, discomfort and insecurity are inhibitors. The model captures the paradox that individuals may simultaneously hold both positive and negative beliefs.

The Technology Readiness Index has been validated as being a predictor of adoption of innovative technologies, and the findings it provides in a certain context equate to different strategies that would apply to a cutting-edge product or service. It is frequently used in research to identify the general innovativeness of a population and/or as moderating variable in a more complete model that explains acceptance of a technology. The TRI and TRI 2.0 instruments are copyrighted, and academic researchers may license them at no cost by contacting the authors for permission.
