= Domestication theory =

Approach in science and technology studies

Domestication theory is an approach in Science and Technology Studies (STS) and media studies that describe the processes by which technology is 'tamed' or appropriated by its users. The theory was originally created by Roger Silverstone, who described four steps that technology goes through when being adapted into peoples' lives:

1. First, technologies are integrated into everyday life and adapted to daily practices.
2. Secondly, the user and its environment change and adapt accordingly.
3. Thirdly, these adaptations feedback into innovation processes in industry, shaping the next generation of technologies and services.
4. Fourthly, conversion, signalling what extent and how the technology has the status of reflecting the cultures of a household.

The theory was initially developed to help understand the adoption and use of new media technologies by households (Silverstone et al. 1992), but has since been expanded in the innovation literature as a tool to understand technologies and innovations entering any consuming unit (workplace, country etc. e.g. Lie et al., Habib, Punie, Sørensen) that can be analysed economically, culturally and sociologically. The domestication approach considers both the practical and the symbolic aspects of the adoption and use of technologies, showing how these two elements- the meanings of things, and their materiality, are equally important understanding how technologies become part of everyday life. It is a foremost a social theory as it highlights the negotiations, challenges to power and control, rule-making and breaking that accompany the introduction of technologies into any social setting.

One variant of domestication theory identified three stages of technology being adapted by users. According to Nancy K. Baym, these three stages are (1) initially marvelous and strange, (2) then become capable of creating greatness and horror and (3) and are then so ordinary as to be invisible (Baym, 2015). This can also be thought of as (1) euphoria, (2) moral panic, and (3) domestication. An example of this is the introduction of video games into society. Initially, there was a euphoric response to video games as it had the potential to improve hand, eye, and brain coordination. Then, moral panic set in and there was a fear of violence, addiction, and obesity. Lastly, there was a domestication of video games with acceptance of the technology as an ordinary part of society.

The Domestication approach has roots in cultural studies of media use, but is informed by Science and technology studies, gender studies of household technology, sociology of everyday life, consumption studies and innovation studies, and has been most widely used in studying the mass adoption of computers, the internet and mobile phones.

As a strand of the Social shaping of technology approach to understanding how technology is created, Domestication theory highlights the role of users in innovation - the work done by individuals and communities in order to make a technology from the outside do practical work, and make sense within that community. This strand of work links to the role of end users, lead users etc. in long term innovation processes (Williams et al. 2004).

Domestication studies are generally done using qualitative methods, such as long interviews and ethnography to explore the emerging meanings of technologies, and the changing routines, and conflicts that would not normally be accessible to quantitative methods.

The Domestication approach uses a number of different concepts to distinguish various aspects of the process. For example: Appropriation is the process of bringing a technology into a household, or another local cultural context; Conversion is the remaking of the meanings, or values and norms associated with the technology and the transfer of these back to the 'outside' world.

The principal criticism of the domestication approach is its reliance on detailed case studies, and its rather descriptive approach which is difficult to turn into prescriptive lessons of the type required by business and policy makers. However, this rich-descriptive approach is also its strength: it enables processes and the complex interplay of artifacts and cultural values to be explored in much more depth than individualistic, quantitative methods.

The Domestication approach, describing the integration of technologies into social relationships and structures using evidence obtained using qualitative methods, stands in sharp contrast to individualistic and quantitative approaches (such as Technology acceptance model) of North-American marketing and IS research, that draw on primarily psychological models.
