= Unified theory of acceptance and use of technology =

Information systems user theory

The unified theory of acceptance and use of technology (UTAUT) is a technology acceptance model formulated by Venkatesh and others in "User acceptance of information technology: Toward a unified view" in the organisational context. The UTAUT aims to explain user intentions to use an information system and subsequent usage behavior. The theory holds that there are four key constructs:

1. performance expectancy,
2. effort expectancy,
3. social influence, and
4. facilitating conditions.

The first three are direct determinants of usage intention, which is a direct determinant of use behavior, whereas the fourth is a direct determinant of use behavior. Gender, age, experience, and voluntariness of use are posited to moderate the impact of the four key constructs on usage intention and behavior. The theory was developed through a review and consolidation of the constructs of eight models that earlier research had employed to explain information systems usage behaviour (theory of reasoned action, technology acceptance model, motivational model, theory of planned behavior, a combined theory of planned behavior/technology acceptance model, model of personal computer use, diffusion of innovations theory, and social cognitive theory). Subsequent validation by Venkatesh et al. (2003) of UTAUT in a longitudinal study found it to account for 70% of the variance in Behavioural Intention to Use (BI) and about 50% in actual use.

Venkatesh, Thong, and Xu (2012), extended the unified theory of acceptance and use of technology (UTAUT) to consumer context popularly known as UTAUT2 by incorporating three new constructs into UTAUT: hedonic motivation, price value, and habit. Facilitating conditions was added as a direct determinant of usage intention and voluntariness of use was dropped as a moderator.

== Application ==
- Koivumäki et al. applied UTAUT to study the perceptions of 243 individuals in northern Finland toward mobile services and technology and found that time spent using the devices did not affect consumer perceptions, but familiarity with the devices and user skills did have an impact.
- Eckhardt et al. applied UTAUT to study social influence of workplace referent groups (superiors, colleagues) on intention to adopt technology in 152 German companies and found significant impact of social influence from workplace referents on information technology adoption.
- Curtis et al. applied UTAUT to the adoption of social media by 409 United States nonprofit organizations. UTAUT had not been previously applied to the use of social media in public relations. They found that organizations with defined public relations departments are more likely to adopt social media technologies and use them to achieve their organizational goals. Women considered social media to be beneficial, and men exhibited more confidence in actively utilizing social media.
- Verhoeven et al. applied UTAUT to study computer use frequency in 714 university freshmen in Belgium and found that UTAUT was also useful in explaining varying frequencies of computer use and differences in information and communication technology skills in secondary school and in the university.
- Welch et al. applied UTAUT to study factors contributing to Mobile learning adoption among 118 museum staff in England. UTAUT had not been previously applied to the use of just-in-time knowledge interventions to development technological knowledge within the museum sector. They found that UTAUT was useful in explaining the determinants of mobile learning adoption.
- Williams, Rana, and Dwivedi (2015), conducted a systematic review of 174 articles that have used the unified theory of acceptance and use of technology (UTAUT).

== Criticism ==
- Bagozzi critiqued the model and its subsequent extensions, stating "UTAUT is a well-meaning and thoughtful presentation," but that it presents a model with 41 independent variables for predicting intentions and at least 8 independent variables for predicting behavior," and that it contributed to the study of technology adoption "reaching a stage of chaos." He proposed instead a unified theory that coheres the "many splinters of knowledge" to explain decision making.
- Van Raaij and Schepers criticized the UTAUT as being less parsimonious than the previous Technology Acceptance Model and TAM2 because its high R^{2} is only achieved when moderating key relationships with up to four variables. They also called the grouping and labeling of items and constructs problematic because a variety of disparate items were combined to reflect a single psychometric construct.
- Li suggested that using moderators to artificially achieve high R^{2} in UTAUT is unnecessary and also impractical for understanding organizational technology adoption, and demonstrated that good predictive power can be achieved even with simple models when proper initial screening procedures are applied. The results provide insights for organizational research design under practical business settings.
- Dwivedi, Y. K., Rana, N. P., Jeyaraj, A., et al. (2019), critically reviewed the Unified Theory of Acceptance and Use of Technology (UTAUT) through combination of meta-analysis and structural equation modelling (MASEM) techniques. They critiqued UTAUT moderators may not be applicable to all contexts, to include missing path from facilitating conditions to behavioural intention, and theorizing individual characteristics variable such as attitude omitted in the original UTAUT model.

== See also ==
- Lazy user model
