= Technology–organization–environment framework =

Model of business organization

The technology-organization-environment framework, also known as the TOE framework, is a theoretical framework that explains technology adoption in organizations and describes how the process of adopting and implementing technological innovations are influenced by the technological context, organizational context, and environmental context. Louis G. Tornatzky and Mitchell Fleischer published the model in 1990.

Numerous application examples of the TOE framework have been summarized by Olivera and Martins (2011).

As Awa, Ojiabo & Orokor (2017) reiterated, the TOE framework is for organizational level analysis. The framework focuses on higher level attributes (i.e. the technological, organizational, and environmental contexts) instead of detailed behaviors of individuals in the organization. To understand technology adoption at individual level, behavioral models such as the theory of reasoned action, the theory of planned behavior, and the technology acceptance model should be applied. While this classification of organization level theory and individual level theory is generally accepted, it also leads to the difficulty of how to investigate the higher level attributes. Information can only be obtained from individuals in the target organization and hence inevitably biased by individuals' viewpoints. Li (2020) has demonstrated a rough equivalence of behavioral models and TOE framework when individual perception has been taken into account.

Despite the TOE framework having been widely used, it has undergone limited theoretical development since its introduction. According to Zhu and Kraemer (2005), the reason for the lack of development is that the TOE framework is "too generic" and offers a high degree of freedom to vary factors and measures so there is little need to change the theory itself. Another important reason, according to Baker (2012), is the theory aligns "too well" with other technology adoption theories and does not offer competitive explanations. Thus, there is very limited tension to modify the framework.
