= Demokratizatsiya =

Demokratizatsiya may refer to:

- Demokratizatsiya (journal), a journal devoted to changes in late Soviet Union and post-Soviet states
- Demokratizatsiya (Soviet Union), a slogan for introduction of democratic elements in the CPSU and Soviet Union

== See also ==
- Democratization (disambiguation)
