= Management Communication Quarterly =

- Discipline: Communication studies, management
- Language: English
- Edited by: Rebecca Meisenbach

Publication details
- History: 1987-present
- Publisher: SAGE Publications
- Frequency: Quarterly
- Impact factor: 2.5 (2022)

Standard abbreviations
- ISO 4: Manag. Commun. Q.

Indexing
- ISSN: 0893-3189 (print); 1552-6798 (web)
- LCCN: 2018207320
- OCLC no.: 41181749

Links
- Journal homepage; Online access; Online archive

Management Communication Quarterly is a peer-reviewed academic journal that covers the field of communication studies pertaining to management and organizational communication. The editor-in-chief is Rebecca Meisenbach (University of Missouri). It was established in 1987 and is published by SAGE Publications.

== Abstracting and indexing ==
The journal is abstracted and indexed in Scopus and the Social Sciences Citation Index. According to the Journal Citation Reports, the journal has a 2022 impact factor of 2.5.
