= Lateral communication =

Lateral communication is the exchange, imparting or sharing of information, ideas or feelings between people within a community, peer groups, departments or units of an organization who are at or about the same hierarchical level as each other for the purpose of coordinating activities, efforts or fulfilling a common purpose or goal

== Examples in organisms ==
Lateral communication in organisms or animals can give rise to collective intelligence, or the appearance of collective intelligence. Examples of lateral communication in organisms include:

- The participants in a flock of birds or a shoal of fish all maintain their relative positions or alter direction simultaneously due to lateral communication.
- Ants, termites and bees coordinate by lateral communication, mediated in the case of ants and termites, for example, by scent trails. The resulting physical structure is an emergent property of the individual entities.
- Bacterial colonies communicate with each other, coordinating, for example, an attack, or the production of slime using lateral communication based on chemical messengers so that as a group they can detect how many colleagues are near and whether they are likely to overwhelm a target.
- The pacemaker cells in the heart, a cardiac pacemaker form a small group; lateral communications sweep through the cells, much like a Mexican wave as a three-dimensional circulating wave, which relays contraction signals to the whole heart.
- With slime mold, millions of individual amoeba-like creatures can spread out and graze the surface of a leaf. When conditions change, the amoeba concentrate and form a slug-like creature that can relocate before forming a spore body and releasing individual spores.
- The position and type of human cells are mediated by lateral communication.
- Meaning:-Lateral communication involves communication across chains of command. It facilitates coordination among departments. It probably takes place because people prefer the informality of lateral communication to the formal downward and upward communication. Those actively involved in lateral communication are called “boundary spanners.” Since “boundary spanning,” allows for accumulation of vast amounts of information, such persons wield tremendous power and enjoy greater status by filtering and communicating with others.

== Organizations and communities ==
Communities communicate and store collective knowledge through lateral communication and is an essential ingredient in making hierarchies work, by compensating for errors in vertical information flows.

In an organization, lateral communication is communication between different individuals/departments at the same organizational level.

The term lateral communication can be used interchangeably with horizontal communication. In his text entitled Organizational Communication, Michael J. Papa defines horizontal communication as "the flow of messages across functional areas at a given level of an organization". People at the same level "communicate directly without going through several levels of organization". Given this elasticity, members of an organization have an easier time with "problem-solving, information sharing across different work groups, and task coordination between departments or project teams". The use of lateral or horizontal communication in the workplace "can also enhance morale and afford a means of resolving conflicts.

Other research asserted, "lateral communication involves not only the movement of information from the upper levels to the lower levels of the organizational hierarchy but also is defined primarily as the quality of information sharing among peers at similar levels. Specifically, lateral communication occurs among coworkers, during staff meetings and informational presentations, throughout shift changes, and among employees regardless of peer types. In short, lateral communication's purpose is to keep organizational personnel informed of all current practices, policies, and procedures".

"Communicating effectively laterally involves the exchange of information between and among all organizational members. While we may perceive that organizational information flows vertically or from top to bottom, in reality, information moves laterally. In other words, as information directives are communicated from an upper to a lower position on the hierarchy, peers at each hierarchical level should quickly interpret and communicate these directives between and among peers at similar hierarchical levels. Thus, it is critical for an organization to understand its structure and culture, which are the two major determinants of the quality of lateral communication.".

== Quality: structure and culture ==
=== Structure ===
- Mechanistic structure – "A mechanistic or hierarchical organizational structure emphasizes specialization in position. Examples include healthcare and governmental organizations where information is communicated based on a chain of command. This organizational structure type is not conducive to lateral communication and, in fact, discourages it. Since direction and coordination are achieved through upper hierarchical levels, peer information sharing is limited. Overall, a mechanistic structure promotes vertical communication or top-down communication with strict alignment and unity of command within the organization".
- Organic structure – "An organic organizational structure is built upon an entrepreneurial concept. Here, the decisions made are decentralized and coordinated by mutual adjustment rather than command and control. Examples include a small business or a manufacturing facility where communication is promoted at all levels of the organization. This organizational structure allows for greater autonomy, promotes individual initiative, and allows employees to be involved in the decision-making process thus enabling employee decision-making to contribute to or detract from organizational goals. In short, an organic organizational structure can encourage and facilitate lateral communication".

=== Culture/climate ===
"Organizational culture refers to the organization's shared visions, values, beliefs, goals, and practices (Gilsdorf, 1998). Deals and Kennedy (1982) have connected culture with effective communication. Strong cultures and effective communication result in employees who are more productive because they know exactly what is expected of them in organizational settings. Gilsdorf (1998) has implied that the more employees perceive a positive or strong organizational culture, the more productive they will be. Poole (1985) has contended that an organization's quality of communication is summed-up in its culture. In many cases, a strong positive organizational culture or climate can encourage employees to communicate effectively laterally when sharing achievements and disappointments. Thus, as Comer (1991) has asserted, managers should actively encourage employees to communicate effectively laterally with their peers. In sum, lateral communication allows for a spirit of collaboration and teamwork by empowering employees at every level of the organizational hierarchy to work effectively together (see, for example, Thamara, 2000)".Lateral communication involves communication across chains of command. It facilitates coordination among departments. It probably takes place because people prefer the informality of lateral communication to the formal downward and upward communication. Those actively involved in lateral communication are called “boundary spanners.” Since “boundary spanning,” allows for accumulation of vast amounts of information, such persons wield tremendous power and enjoy greater status by filtering and communicating with others.

== Challenges ==
Although lateral communication can be effective, according to Papa, "horizontal communication problems occur because of territoriality, rivalry, specialization, and simple lack of motivation." In addition to these problems and in general, "organizations that traditionally have functioned under rigid authority structures with fixed lines of communication may find that the values and expectations that members have acquired under such systems inhibit attempts at horizontal communication."

Other problems with this form of communication can happen between multinational corporations. "Horizontal communication between subsidiaries of the same multinational corporation (MNC) is a problem faced by staff as the demands for communicating across borders are pushed downwards in the organizational hierarchy.".

=== Territoriality ===
Territoriality often occurs when members of an organization "control task-related activity within a defined and fixed jurisdictional area" and as a result "regard others' involvement in that area as territorial encroachment." "Departments value their turf and strive to protect it. This problem may be compounded by interdepartmental rivalries that arise from win/lose the competition for rewards and resources"

=== Rivalry ===
Rivalry within organizations occurs for example when different groups at a given organization level fail to cooperate. For example, Papa gives an example of "corporate executives in a national department store chain" who "encountered territorial rivalry when they discovered that local stores within each of the company's major sales districts refused to cooperate with one another on sales promotions". "Stores within the same sales region literally were in competition with one another as well as with other department store chains"

=== Specialization ===
Specialization can inhibit communication when organizations do not have uniformity within departments. Specialization can occur within procedures or jargon used by different departments. For example, when "different specialties use the same terms in different ways", this can create confusion and miscommunication. When this occurs organizations have trouble functioning properly and do not run smoothly.

=== Motivation ===
"Horizontal communication often fails simply because organization members are unwilling to expend the additional effort that it requires." "Horizontal communication may require contact with people in units that are well removed from our own. The channels and rules of interaction may be unclear. We do not really know these people. The need to communicate with them makes us uneasy or takes too much time, so we avoid or ignore it"

== See also ==
- Central media
- Collective intelligence
- Delphi technique
- Lateral diffusion
- Law of unintended consequences
- LinkedIn
- Tacit knowledge
- The Wisdom of Crowds
