= Diffusion of Innovations =

1962 sociology book by Everett Rogers

Diffusion of Innovations is a 1962 book by Everett Rogers.

Rogers synthesized research from over 508 diffusion studies across the fields that initially influenced the theory: anthropology, early sociology, rural sociology, education, industrial sociology and medical sociology. Rogers applied it to the healthcare setting to address issues with hygiene, cancer prevention, family planning, and drunk driving. Using his synthesis, Rogers produced a theory of the adoption of innovations among individuals and organizations.

In the mid-2000s, The Diffusion of Innovations became the second most-cited book in the social sciences.

== See also ==
- Early adopter
