= Democratization of technology =

Spread and access to technology

Democratization of technology is the process by which access to technology rapidly extends to an ever-broader audience, especially from a select group of people to the average public. New technologies and improved user experiences have empowered those outside of the technical industry to access and use technological products and services. At an increasing scale, consumers have greater access to use and purchase technologically sophisticated products, as well as to participate meaningfully in the development of these products. Industry innovation and user demand have been associated with more affordable, user-friendly products. This is an ongoing process, beginning with the development of mass production and increasing dramatically as digitization became commonplace.

Thomas Friedman argued that the era of globalization has been characterized by the democratization of technology, democratization of finance, and democratization of information. Technology has been critical in the latter two processes, facilitating the rapid expansion of access to specialized knowledge and tools, as well as changing the way that people view and demand such access. A counter argument is that this is just a process of 'massification' - more people can use banks, technology, have access to information, but it does not mean there is any more democratic influence over its production, or that this massification promotes Democracy.

== History ==
Scholars and social critics often cite the invention of the printing press as a major invention that changed the course of history. The force of the printing press rested not in its impact on the printing industry or inventors, but on its ability to transmit information to a broader public by way of mass production. This event is so widely recognized because of its social impact – as a democratizing force.

The printing press is often seen as the historical counterpart to the Internet.

After the development of the Internet in 1969, its use remained limited to communications between scientists and within government, although use of email and boards gained popularity among those with access. It did not become a popular means of communication until the 1990s. In 1993 the US federal government opened the Internet to commerce and the creation of HTML formed the basis for universal accessibility.

=== Major innovations ===
The Internet has played a critical role in modern life as a typical feature of most Western households, and has been key in the democratization of knowledge. It not only constitutes arguably the most critical innovation in this trend thus far; it has also allowed users to gain knowledge of and access to other technologies. Users can learn of new developments more quickly, and purchase high-tech products otherwise only actively marketed to recognized experts. Social media has also empowered and emboldened users to become contributors and critics of technological developments. Some have argued that cloud computing is having a major effect by allowing users greater access through mobility and pay-as-you-use capacity.

The open-source model allows users to participate directly in development of software, rather than indirect participation, through contributing opinions. By being shaped by the user, development is directly responsive to user demand and can be obtained for free or at a low cost. In a comparable trend, Arduino and littleBits have made electronics more accessible to users of all backgrounds and ages. The development of 3D printers has the potential to increasingly democratize production.

Generative AI tools have the potential to democratize the process of innovation by improving the ability of individuals to specify and visualize ideas. The democratization of artificial intelligence refers to the transition from AI as a high-cost, specialized field to one accessible to non-experts and smaller organizations. This process is driven by the release of open-weights models, the availability of cloud computing for model training, and the emergence of no-code development platforms. While early AI development was concentrated within Big Tech firms and elite research universities, the 2020s saw a proliferation of public tools like ChatGPT and repositories such as Hugging Face, which lowered the technical barriers to entry. However, the trend has faced criticism as the "illusion of democratization," as the underlying GPU hardware remains concentrated among a few global providers.

== Cultural impact ==
This trend is linked to the spread of knowledge of and ability to perform high-tech tasks, challenging previous conceptions of expertise.

Widespread access to technology, including lower costs, was critical to the transition to the new economy. Similarly, democratization of technology was also fuelled by this economic transition, which produced demands for technological innovation and optimism in technology-driven progress.

Since the 1980s, a spreading constructivist conception of technology has emphasized that the social and technical domains are critically intertwined. Scholars have argued that technology is non-neutral, defined contextually and locally by a certain relationship with society.

Andrew Feenberg, a central thinker in the philosophy of technology, argued that democratizing technology means expanding technological design to include alternative interests and values. When successful in doing so, this can be a tool for increasing inclusiveness. This also suggests an important participatory role for consumers if technology is to be truly democratic. Feenberg asserts that this must be achieved by consumer intervention in a liberated design process.

Improved access to specialized knowledge and tools has been associated with an increase in the "do it yourself" (DIY) trend. This has also been associated with consumerization, whereby personal or privately owned devices and software are also used for business purposes. Some have argued that this is linked to reduced dependence on traditional information technology departments.

Astra Taylor, the author of the book The People's Platform: Taking Back Power and Culture in the Digital Age, argues, "The promotion of Internet-enabled amateurism is a lazy substitute for real equality of opportunity."

=== Industry impact ===
In some ways, democratization of technology has strengthened this industry. Markets have broadened and diversified. Consumer feedback and input is available at a very low or no cost.

However, related industries are experiencing decreased demand for qualified professionals as consumers are able to fill more of their demands themselves. Users of a range of types and status have access to increasingly similar technology. Because of the decreased costs and expertise necessary to use products and software, professionals (e.g. in the audio industry) may experience loss of work.

In some cases, technology is accessible but sufficiently complex that most users without specialized training are able to operate it without necessarily understanding how it works. Additionally, the process of consumerization has led to an influx in the number of devices in businesses and accessing private networks that IT departments cannot control or access. While this can lead to lowered operating costs and increased innovation, it is also associated with security concerns that most businesses are unable to address at the pace of the spread of technology.

=== Political impact ===
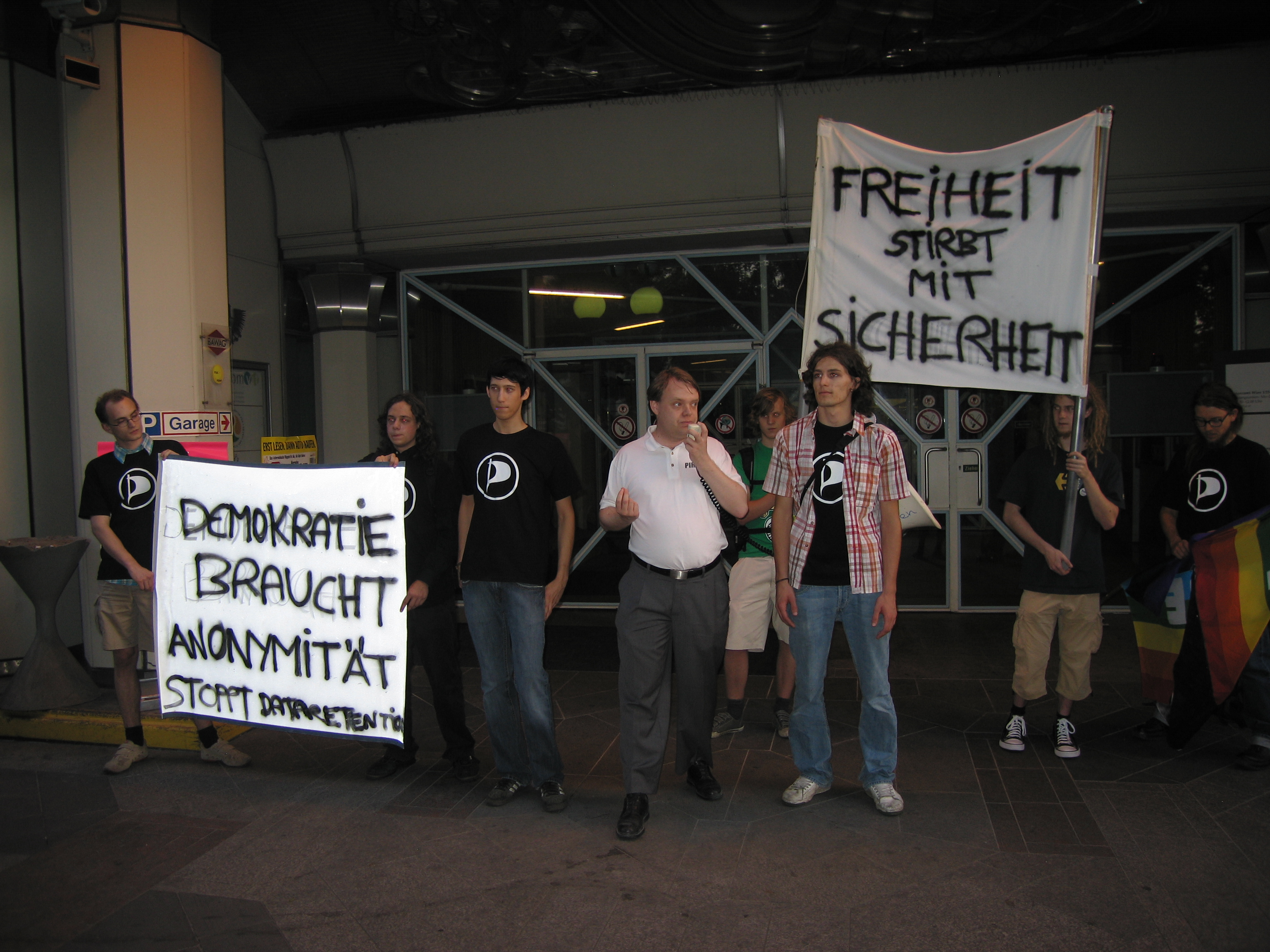
At a demonstration at BMVIT, banners read, "Democracy needs anonymity – stop data retention" (left) and "Liberty dies with security" (right).

Some scholars have argued that technological change will bring about a third wave of democracy. The Internet has been recognized for its role in promoting increased citizen advocacy and government transparency. Jesse Chen, a leading thinker in democratic engagement technologies, distinguishes the democratizing effects of technology from democracy itself. Chen has argued that, while the Internet may have democratizing effects, the Internet alone cannot deliver democracy at all levels of society unless technologies are purposely designed for the nuances of democracy, specifically the engagement of large groups of people in between elections in and beyond government.

The spread of the Internet and other forms of technology has led to increased global connectivity. Many scholars believe that it has been associated in the developing world not only with increased Western influence, but also with the spread of democracy through increased communication, efficiency, and access to information. Scholars have drawn associations between the level of technological connectedness and democracy in many nations.

Technology can enhance democracy in the developed world as well. In addition to increased communication and transparency, some electorates have implemented online voting to accommodate an increased number of citizens.

== See also ==
- Diffusion of innovations
