= Cultural framework =

Common culture models in a given society

Cultural framework (culture model) is a term used in social science to explain traditions, value systems, myths and symbols that are common in a given society. A given society may have multiple cultural frameworks (for example, United States society has different cultural frameworks for its white American and African American populations). Usually cultural frameworks are mixed as certain individuals or entire groups can be familiar with any number of cultural frameworks.

There is an important relation between cultural frameworks and ideologies: Most successful ideologies are closely connected to cultural frameworks of societies they spread in. Cultural framework theory should not, however, be confused with ideology, a separate concept. Nazism, for example, was an ideology in Nazi Germany at the time, while religious beliefs, patriotism, and traditions dating back to Germanic and Frankish tribes were part of the German cultural framework.
