= Lazy user model =

Information systems model about solution selection

The lazy user model of solution selection (LUM) is a model in information systems proposed by Tétard and Collan that tries to explain how an individual selects a solution to fulfill a need from a set of possible solution alternatives. LUM expects that a solution is selected from a set of available solutions based on the amount of effort the solutions require from the user – the user is supposed to select the solution that carries the least effort. The model is applicable to a number of different types of situations, but it can be said to be closely related to technology acceptance models.

The model draws from earlier works on how least effort affects human behaviour in information seeking and in scaling of language.

Earlier research within the discipline of information systems especially within the topic of technology acceptance and technology adoption is closely related to the lazy user model.

== The model structure ==
The model supposes that after the user need has defined the set of possible solutions that fulfill the user need and the user state has limited the set to the available plausible solutions that fulfill the user need the user will "select" a solution from the set to fulfill the need. Obviously if the set is empty the user does not have a way to fulfill the need. The lazy user model assumes that the user will make the selection from the limited set based on the lowest level of effort. Effort is understood as the combination of monetary cost + time needed + physical/mental effort needed.

== Considerations ==
The lazy user theory has implications when thinking about the effect of learning in technology adoption (for example in the adoption of new information systems).

== See also ==
- Diffusion of innovations
- Technology acceptance model
- Technology adoption lifecycle
- Theory of planned behavior
- Unified theory of acceptance and use of technology
