= Everett Rogers =

American communication theorist and sociologist

Everett M. Rogers
- Born: Everett Mitchell Rogers; March 6, 1931; Carroll, Iowa, US
- Died: October 21, 2004 (aged 73); Albuquerque, New Mexico, US
- Education: Iowa State University (BS, MS, PhD)
- Alma mater: Iowa State University
- Occupations: Professor, Researcher, Educator, Consultant
- Spouse: Corinne Shefner-Rogers
- Children: 2
- Writing career
- Language: English
- Subjects: Development Communication, International Communication, Communication Theory
- Notable works: Diffusion of Innovations, Communication Technology, A History of Communication Study

Everett M. "Ev" Rogers (March 6, 1931 – October 21, 2004) was an American communication theorist and sociologist, who originated the diffusion of innovations theory and introduced the term early adopter. He was distinguished professor emeritus in the department of communication and journalism at the University of New Mexico.

== Education and career ==
Rogers was born on his family's Pinehurst Farm in Carroll, Iowa, in 1931. His father loved electromechanical farm innovations, but was highly reluctant to utilize biological–chemical innovations, so he resisted adopting the new hybrid seed corn, even though it yielded 25% more crop and was resistant to drought. During the Iowa drought of 1936, while the hybrid seed corn stood tall on the neighbor's farm, the crop on the Rogers' farm wilted. Rogers' father was finally convinced.

Rogers had no plans to attend university until a school teacher drove him and some classmates to Ames to visit Iowa State University. Rogers decided to pursue a degree there. He received a B.S. in agriculture in 1952. He then served in the Korean War for two years (1952–1954). He returned to Iowa State University to earn a M.S. in 1955 and a Ph.D. in 1957 both in rural sociology.

Rogers held faculty positions at Ohio State University (1957–63), Michigan State University (1964–1973), and the University of Michigan (1973–1975). He was the Janet M. Peck Professor of International Communication at Stanford University (1975–1985) and the Walter H. Annenberg Professor and associate dean for doctoral studies in the Annenberg School for Communication at the University of Southern California (1985–1993).

As Fulbright Lecturer, Rogers taught the National University of Colombia in Bogotá (1963–1964) and at the University of Paris in France (1981). He was also distinguished visiting professor at New Mexico State University (1977), visiting professor at Ibero-American University in Mexico (1979), Ludwig Erhard Professor at the University of Bayreuth in Germany (1996), Wee Kim Wee Professor (1998) and Nanyang Professor (2000–2001) at Nanyang Technological University in Singapore, and visiting professor at Johns Hopkins University (1999–2000). He served as president of the International Communication Association (1980–1981) and fellow at the Center for Advanced Study in the Behavioral Sciences in Stanford, California (1991–1992).

In 1993, Rogers moved to the University of New Mexico as chair of the department of communication and journalism. He had become fond of Albuquerque while he was stationed at an airbase during the Korean War. He helped the UNM launch a doctoral program in communication with a special emphasis on cross-cultural and intercultural contexts. Rogers suffered from kidney disease and retired from the UNM in the summer of 2004. He died a few months later, survived by his wife, Dr. Corinne Shefner-Rogers, and two sons: David Rogers and Everett King. During his 47-year academic career, Rogers authored more than 30 books and over 500 articles.

== Diffusion of innovations ==
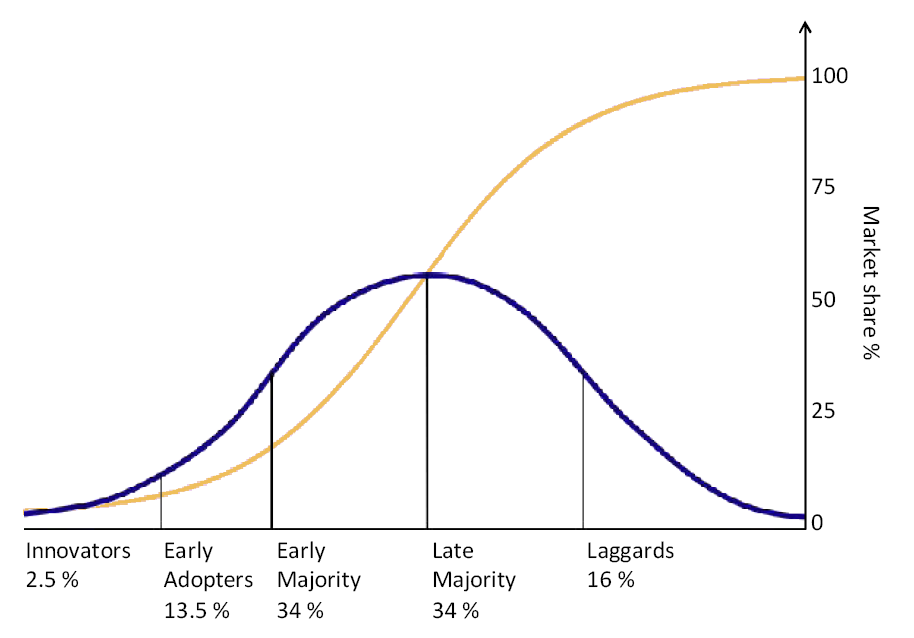
The diffusion of innovations according to Rogers. With successive groups of consumers adopting the new technology (shown in blue), its market share (yellow) will eventually reach the saturation level.

When the first edition of Diffusion of Innovations was published in 1962, Rogers was an assistant professor of rural sociology at Ohio State University. He was 31 years old and becoming a renowned academic figure. In the mid-2000s, The Diffusion of Innovations became the second most-cited book in the social sciences. The fifth edition (2003, with Nancy Singer Olaguera) addresses the spread of the Internet, and how it has transformed the way human beings communicate and adopt new ideas.

Rogers proposes that adopters of any new innovation or idea can be categorized as innovators (2.5%), early adopters (13.5%), early majority (34%), late majority (34%) and laggards (16%), based on the mathematically based Bell curve. These categories, based on standard deviations from the mean of the normal curve, provide a common language for innovation researchers. Each adopter's willingness and ability to adopt an innovation depends on their awareness, interest, evaluation, trial, and adoption. People can fall into different categories for different innovations—a farmer might be an early adopter of mechanical innovations, but a late majority adopter of biological innovations or VCRs.

When graphed, the rate of adoption formed what came to typify the Diffusion of Innovations model, a sigmoid curve. The graph shows a cumulative percentage of adopters over time–slow at the start, more rapid as adoption increases, then leveling off until only a small percentage of laggards have not adopted.

His research and work became widely accepted in communications and technology adoption studies, and also found its way into a variety of other social science studies. Rogers was also able to relate his communications research to practical health problems, including hygiene, family planning, cancer prevention, and drunk driving.

== Entertainment education ==
In the early 1990s Rogers turned his attention to the field of Entertainment-Education. With funding from Population Communications International, he evaluated a radio drama designed to improve public health in Tanzania called Twende na Wakati (Let's Go With the Times). With Arvind Singhal of Ohio University he co-wrote Entertainment Education: A Communication Strategy for Social Change.

To commemorate his contributions to the field, the University of Southern California's Norman Lear Center established the Everett M. Rogers Award for Achievement in Entertainment-Education, which recognizes outstanding practice or research in the field of entertainment education.

== Publications ==
=== Books ===
- Rogers, E. M. (2008). The fourteenth paw: Growing up on an Iowa farm in the 1930s. Singapore: Asian Media Information and Communication Center.
- Rogers, E. M. (2003). Diffusion of innovations (5th ed.). New York, NY: Free Press.
- Rogers, E. M., & Steinfatt, T. M. (1999). Intercultural communication. Prospect Heights, IL: Waveland Press.
- Rogers, E. M. (1994). A history of communication study: A biographical approach. New York, NY: Free Press.
- Rogers, E. M. (1986). Communication technology: The new media in society. New York, NY: Free Press.
- Rogers, E. M., & Balle, F. (Eds.). (1985). The media revolution in America and in Western Europe. Norwood, NJ: Ablex.
- Rogers, E. M., & Larsen, J. K. (1984). Silicon Valley fever: Growth of high-technology culture. New York, NY: Basic Books.
- Rogers, E. M., & Kincaid, D. L. (1981). Communication networks: Toward a new paradigm for research. New York, NY: Free Press.
- Rogers, E. M. (Ed.). (1976). Communication and development: Critical perspectives. Beverly Hills, CA: Sage.
- Rogers, E. M., & Agarwala-Rogers, R. (1976). Communication in organizations. New York, NY: Free Press.
- Rogers, E. M. (1973). Communication strategies for family planning. New York, NY: Free Press.
- Rogers, E. M. (1969). Modernization among peasants: The impact of communication. New York, NY: Holt, Rinehart & Winston.

=== Articles ===
- Rogers, E. M. (1973). Mass media and interpersonal communication. In I. d. S. Pool, F. W. Frey, W. Schramm, N. Maccoby, & E. B. Parker (Eds.), Handbook of communication (pp. 290–310). Chicago, IL: Rand McNally.
- Rogers, E. M. (1976). Communication and development: The passing of the dominant paradigm. Communication Research, 3(2), 213–240.
- Rogers, E. M. (1982). The empirical and critical schools of communication research. In M. Burgoon (Ed.), Communication yearbook (Vol. 5, pp. 125–144). New Brunswick, NJ: Transaction Books.
- Rogers, E. M. (1985). Methodology for meta-research. In H. H. Greenbaum, S. A. Hellweg, & J. W. Walter (Eds.), Organizational communication: Abstracts, analysis, and overview (Vol. 10, pp. 13–33). Beverly Hills, CA: Sage.
- Rogers, E. M. (1990). Communication and social change. In G. L. Dahnke & G. W. Clatterbuck (Eds.), Human communication: Theory and research (pp. 259–271). Belmont, CA: Wadsworth.
- Rogers, E. M. (1989). Inquiry in development communication. In M. K. Asante & W. B. Gudykunt (Eds.), Handbook of international and intercultural communication (pp. 67–86). Newbury Park, CA: Sage.
- Rogers, E. M. (1994). The field of health communication today. American Behavioral Scientist, 38(2), 208–214.
- Rogers, E. M. (1999). Anatomy of the two subdisciplines of communication study. Human Communication Research, 25(4), 618–631.
- Rogers, E. M. (1999). Georg Simmel's concept of the stranger and intercultural communication research. Communication Theory, 9(1), 58–74.
- Rogers, E. M. (2000). The extensions of men: The correspondence of Marshall McLuhan and Edward T. Hall. Mass Communication and Society, 3(1), 117–135.

== See also ==
- Communication sciences
- Communication studies
- Communication theory
- Development communication
- Diffusion of innovations
- D. Lawrence Kincaid
- Mass communication
- Mass media
- Technology adoption lifecycle
- Wilbur Schramm
