= Technology acceptance model =

Information systems theory

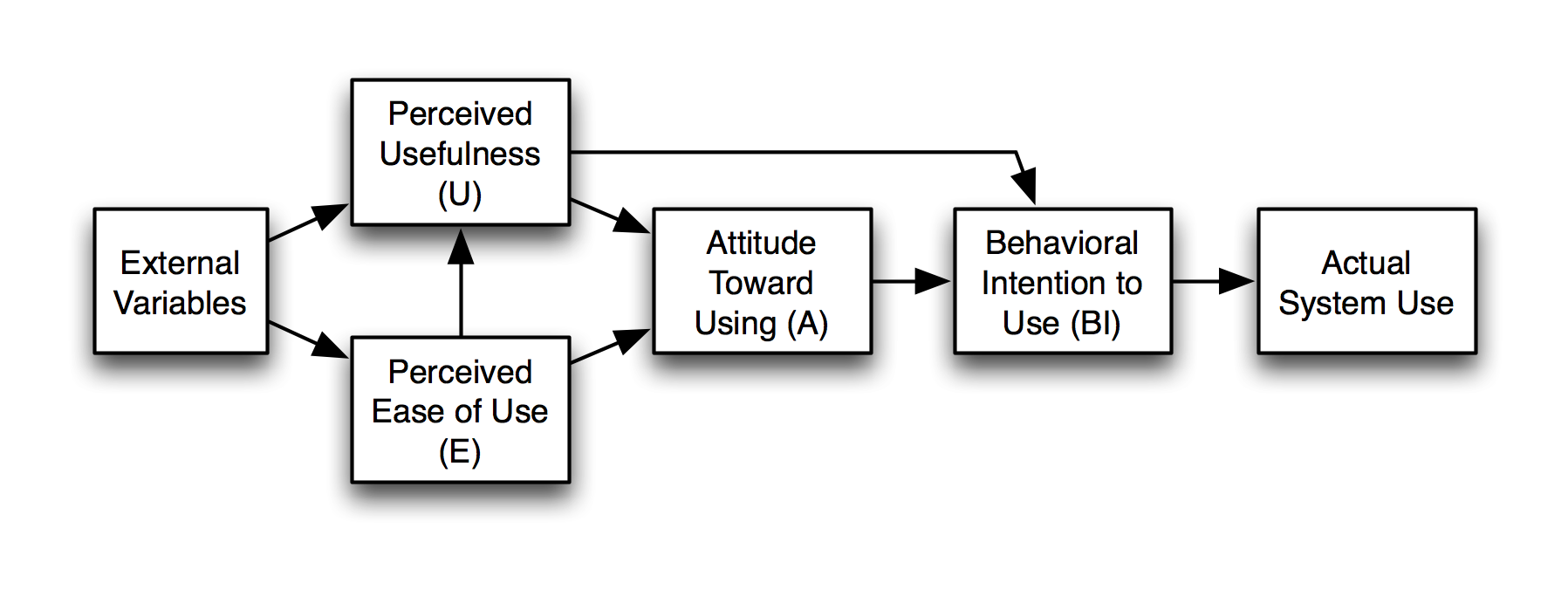
Technology acceptance model

The technology acceptance model (TAM) is an information systems theory that models how users come to accept and use a technology.

The actual system use is the end-point where people use the technology. Behavioral intention is a factor that leads people to use the technology. The behavioral intention (BI) is influenced by the attitude (A) which is the general impression of the technology.

The model suggests that when users are presented with a new technology, a number of factors influence their decision about how and when they will use it, notably:

- Perceived usefulness (PU) – This was defined by Fred Davis as "the degree to which a person believes that using a particular system would enhance their job performance". It means whether or not someone perceives that technology to be useful for what they want to do.
- Perceived ease-of-use (PEOU) – Davis defined this as "the degree to which a person believes that using a particular system would be free from effort". If the technology is easy to use, then the barrier is conquered. If it's not easy to use and the interface is complicated, no one has a positive attitude towards it.

External variables such as social influence is an important factor to determine the attitude. When these things (TAM) are in place, people will have the attitude and intention to use the technology. However, the perception may change depending on age and gender because everyone is different.

The TAM has been continuously studied and expanded—the two major upgrades being the TAM 2 and the unified theory of acceptance and use of technology (or UTAUT). A TAM 3 has also been proposed in the context of e-commerce with an inclusion of the effects of trust and perceived risk on system use.

== Background ==
TAM is one of the most influential extensions of Ajzen and Fishbein's theory of reasoned action (TRA) in the literature. Davis's technology acceptance model (Davis, 1989; Davis, Bagozzi, & Warshaw, 1989) is the most widely applied model of users' acceptance and usage of technology (Venkatesh, 2000). It was developed by Fred Davis and Richard Bagozzi. TAM replaces many of TRA's attitude measures with the two technology acceptance measures—ease of use, and usefulness. TRA and TAM, both of which have strong behavioural elements, assume that when someone forms an intention to act, that they will be free to act without limitation. In the real world there will be many constraints, such as limited freedom to act.

Bagozzi, Davis and Warshaw say:

Because new technologies such as personal computers are complex and an element of uncertainty exists in the minds of decision makers with respect to the successful adoption of them, people form attitudes and intentions toward trying to learn to use the new technology prior to initiating efforts directed at using. Attitudes towards usage and intentions to use may be ill-formed or lacking in conviction or else may occur only after preliminary strivings to learn to use the technology evolve. Thus, actual usage may not be a direct or immediate consequence of such attitudes and intentions.

Earlier research on the diffusion of innovations also suggested a prominent role for perceived ease of use. Tornatzky and Klein analysed the adoption, finding that compatibility, relative advantage, and complexity had the most significant relationships with adoption across a broad range of innovation types. Eason studied perceived usefulness in terms of a fit between systems, tasks and job profiles, using the terms "task fit" to describe the metric. Legris, Ingham and Collerette suggest that TAM must be extended to include variables that account for change processes and that this could be achieved through adoption of the innovation model into TAM.

== Usage ==
Several researchers have replicated Davis's original study to provide empirical evidence on the relationships that exist between usefulness, ease of use and system use. Much attention has focused on testing the robustness and validity of the questionnaire instrument used by Davis. Adams et al. replicated the work of Davis to demonstrate the validity and reliability of his instrument and his measurement scales. They also extended it to different settings and, using two different samples, they demonstrated the internal consistency and replication reliability of the two scales. Hendrickson et al. found high reliability and good test-retest reliability. Szajna found that the instrument had predictive validity for intent to use, self-reported usage and attitude toward use. The sum of this research has confirmed the validity of the Davis instrument, and to support its use with different populations of users and different software choices.

Segars and Grover re-examined Adams et al.'s) replication of the Davis work. They were critical of the measurement model used, and postulated a different model based on three constructs: usefulness, effectiveness, and ease-of-use. These findings do not yet seem to have been replicated. However, some aspects of these findings were tested and supported by Workman by separating the dependent variable into information use versus technology use.

Mark Keil and his colleagues have developed (or, perhaps rendered more popularisable) Davis's model into what they call the Usefulness/EOU Grid, which is a 2×2 grid where each quadrant represents a different combination of the two attributes. In the context of software use, this provides a mechanism for discussing the current mix of usefulness and EOU for particular software packages, and for plotting a different course if a different mix is desired, such as the introduction of even more powerful software. The TAM model has been used in most technological and geographic contexts. One of these contexts is health care, which is growing rapidly

Venkatesh and Davis extended the original TAM model to explain perceived usefulness and usage intentions in terms of social influence (subjective norms, voluntariness, image) and cognitive instrumental processes (job relevance, output quality, result demonstrability, perceived ease of use). The extended model, referred to as TAM2, was tested in both voluntary and mandatory settings. The results strongly supported TAM2.

- Subjective norm – An individual's perception that other individuals who are important to him/her/them consider if he/she/they could perform a behavior. This was consistent with the theory of reasoned action (TRA).
- Voluntariness – This was defined by Venkatesh & Davis as "extent to which potential adopters perceive the adoption decision to be non-mandatory".
- Image – This was defined by Moore & Benbasat as "the degree to which use of an innovation perceived to enhance one's status in one's social system".
- Job relevance – Venkatesh & Davis defined this as personal perspective on the extent to which the target system is suitable for the job.
- Output quality – Venkatesh & Davis defined this as personal perception of the system's ability to perform specific tasks.
- Result demonstrability – The production of tangible results will directly influence the system's usefulness.

In an attempt to integrate the main competing user acceptance models, Venkatesh et al. formulated the unified theory of acceptance and use of technology (UTAUT). This model was found to outperform each of the individual models (Adjusted R square of 69 percent). UTAUT has been adopted by some recent studies in healthcare.

In addition, authors Jun et al. also think that the technology acceptance model is essential to analyze the factors affecting customers’ behavior towards online food delivery services. It is also a widely adopted theoretical model to demonstrate the acceptance of new technology fields. The foundation of TAM is a series of concepts that clarifies and predicts people’s behaviors with their beliefs, attitudes, and behavioral intention. In TAM, perceived ease of use and perceived usefulness, considered general beliefs, play a more vital role than salient beliefs in attitudes toward utilizing a particular technology.

== Alternative models ==
1. The MPT model: Independent of TAM, Scherer developed the matching person and technology model in 1986 as part of her National Science Foundation-funded dissertation research. The MPT model is fully described in her 1993 text, "Living in the State of Stuck", now in its 4th edition. The MPT model has accompanying assessment measures used in technology selection and decision-making, as well as outcomes research on differences among technology users, non-users, avoiders, and reluctant users.
2. The HMSAM: TAM has been effective for explaining many kinds of systems use (i.e. e-learning, learning management systems, webportals, etc.) (Fathema, Shannon, Ross, 2015; Fathema, Ross, Witte, 2014). However, TAM is not ideally suited to explain adoption of purely intrinsic or hedonic systems (e.g., online games, music, learning for pleasure). Thus, an alternative model to TAM, called the hedonic-motivation system adoption model (HMSAM) was proposed for these kinds of systems by Lowry et al. HMSAM is designed to improve the understanding of hedonic-motivation systems (HMS) adoption. HMS are systems used primarily to fulfill users' intrinsic motivations, such for online gaming, virtual worlds, online shopping, learning/education, online dating, digital music repositories, social networking, only pornography, gamified systems, and for general gamification. Instead of a minor TAM extension, HMSAM is an HMS-specific system acceptance model based on an alternative theoretical perspective, which is in turn grounded in flow-based cognitive absorption (CA). HMSAM may be especially useful in understanding gamification elements of systems use.
3. Extended TAM: Several studies proposed extension of original TAM (Davis, 1989) by adding external variables in it with an aim of exploring the effects of external factors on users' attitude, behavioral intention and actual use of technology. Several factors have been examined so far. For example, perceived self-efficacy, facilitating conditions, and systems quality (Fathema, Shannon, Ross, 2015, Fathema, Ross, Witte, 2014). This model has also been applied in the acceptance of health care technologies.

== Criticisms ==
TAM has been widely criticised, despite its frequent use, leading the original proposers to attempt to redefine it several times. Criticisms of TAM as a "theory" include its questionable heuristic value, limited explanatory and predictive power, triviality, and lack of any practical value. Benbasat and Barki suggest that TAM "has diverted researchers' attention away from other important research issues and has created an illusion of progress in knowledge accumulation. Furthermore, the independent attempts by several researchers to expand TAM in order to adapt it to the constantly changing IT environments has lead [sic] to a state of theoretical chaos and confusion". In general, TAM focuses on the individual 'user' of a computer, with the concept of 'perceived usefulness', with extension to bring in more and more factors to explain how a user 'perceives' 'usefulness', and ignores the essentially social processes of IS development and implementation, without questioning whether more technology is actually better, and the social consequences of IS use. Lunceford argues that the framework of perceived usefulness and ease of use overlooks other issues, such as cost and structural imperatives that force users into adopting the technology. For a recent analysis and critique of TAM, see Bagozzi.

Legris et al. claim that, together, TAM and TAM2 account for only 40% of a technological system's use.

Perceived ease of use is less likely to be a determinant of attitude and usage intention according to studies of telemedicine, mobile commerce, and online banking.

== See also ==
- Diffusion (business)
- Diffusion of innovations
- Domestication theory
- Lazy user model
- List of marketing topics
- New product development
- Product life cycle management
- Research and development
- Technology adoption lifecycle
- Technology lifecycle
- Theory of planned behavior
- Technology–organization–environment framework
