= Communication Quarterly =

- Discipline: Communication Studies
- Language: English
- Edited by: Chris R. Morse

Publication details
- Former name(s): Today's Speech
- History: 1976–present
- Publisher: Routledge
- Frequency: 5/year
- Open access: Hybrid

Standard abbreviations
- ISO 4: Commun. Q.

Indexing
- ISSN: 0146-3373 (print); 1746-4102 (web)
- LCCN: 77649692
- OCLC no.: 643833267

Links
- Journal homepage; Online access; Online archive

Communication Quarterly is a peer-reviewed academic journal that is published five times a year by Routledge on behalf of the Eastern Communication Association. It covers research in the communication discipline. It was established in 1953 as Today's Speech, before obtaining its current title in 1976. The editor-in-chief is Chris R. Morse (Bryant University).
