= Early adopter =

Early customer of a company, product, or technology

An early adopter or lighthouse customer is an early customer of a given company, product, or technology. The term originates from Everett M. Rogers' Diffusion of Innovations (1962).

== History ==
Typically, early adopters are customers who, in addition to using the vendor's product or technology, also provide considerable and candid feedback to help the vendor refine its future product releases, as well as the associated means of distribution, service, and support. Early adoption could also be referred to as a form of testing in the early stages of a project.

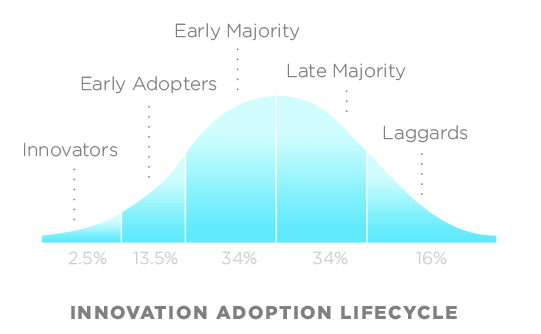
Early adopters as shown in the Rogers' bell curve

The relationship is synergistic. The customer receives early (and sometimes unique, or at least uniquely early) access to an advantageous new product or technology. In return, the customer may also serve as a kind of guinea pig.

In exchange for being an early adopter, and thus being exposed to the problems, risks, and annoyances common to early-stage product testing and deployment, the "lighthouse customer" is sometimes given especially attentive vendor assistance and support, even to the point of having personnel at the customer's work site to assist with implementation. The customer is sometimes given preferential pricing, terms, and conditions, although new technology is often very expensive, so the early adopter still often pays quite a lot.

The vendor, on the other hand, benefits from receiving early revenues, and also from a lighthouse customer's endorsement and assistance in further developing the product and its go-to-market mechanisms. Acquiring lighthouse customers is a common step in new product development and implementation. The real-world focus that this type of relationship can bring to a vendor can be extremely valuable.

Early adoption does come with pitfalls: early versions of products may be buggy and/or prone to malfunction. Furthermore, more efficient, and sometimes less expensive, versions of the product usually appear a few months after the initial release (Apple iPhone). The trend of new technology costing more at release is often referred to as the "early adopter tax".

== See also ==
- Beta test – Stages in creation of computer software
- Eating your own dog food – Term for an organization using its own product
- Focus group – Group interviewed to analyse opinions
- Participatory design – Active involvement of all stakeholders in the design process
- Technology adoption lifecycle – Sociological model
