= Entertainment-Education =

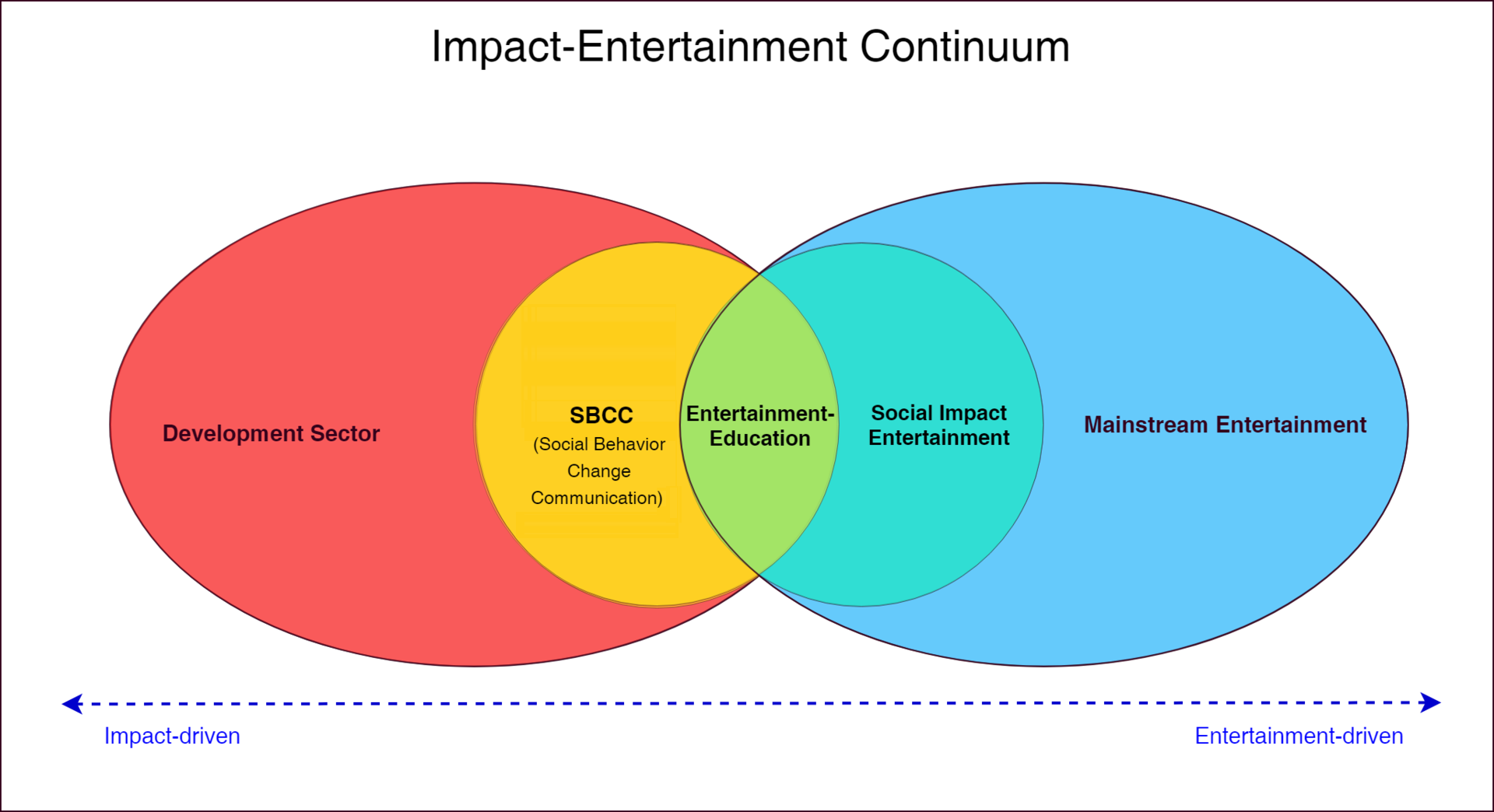
Entertainment-Education on the spectrum

Entertainment-Education (EE) is a communication strategy that aims to alleviate a social issue or educate the public through a custom-tailored piece of entertainment. It is defined by a set of techniques and methodologies which all aim to use various levels of mass media to communicate social and behavior change.

On the impact-entertainment spectrum, EE is balanced between social impact entertainment (SIE) and social and behavior change communication (SBCC). The primary distinction that can be drawn to SIE is that in Entertainment-Education, the "impact issue" usually comes first; the characters and story are built around the issue. In SIE, the story usually originates projects, and impact issues are woven into or extracted out of an existing narrative.

As of 2009, Entertainment-Education is defined as: "a theory-based communication process for purposefully embedding educational and social issues in the creation, production, processing and dissemination process of an entertainment program, in order to achieve desired individual, community, institutional, and societal changes among the intended media user population."

== History ==
In 1950, the UK-based radio soap opera The Archers broke ground by being specifically designed to educate the British people about farming issues and to help increase productivity in the postwar era of rationing and food shortages. It is the longest-running soap opera in the world, and is still broadcast today with millions of listeners.

Miguel Sabido, a Mexican TV producer, further formalized the field. He initially called it "Entertainment with a proven social benefit" in the 1960s, which Everett Rogers re-branded as "Entertainment and Education" in 1979, and Patrick Coleman simplified as "Entertainment-Education", which is the presently used term.

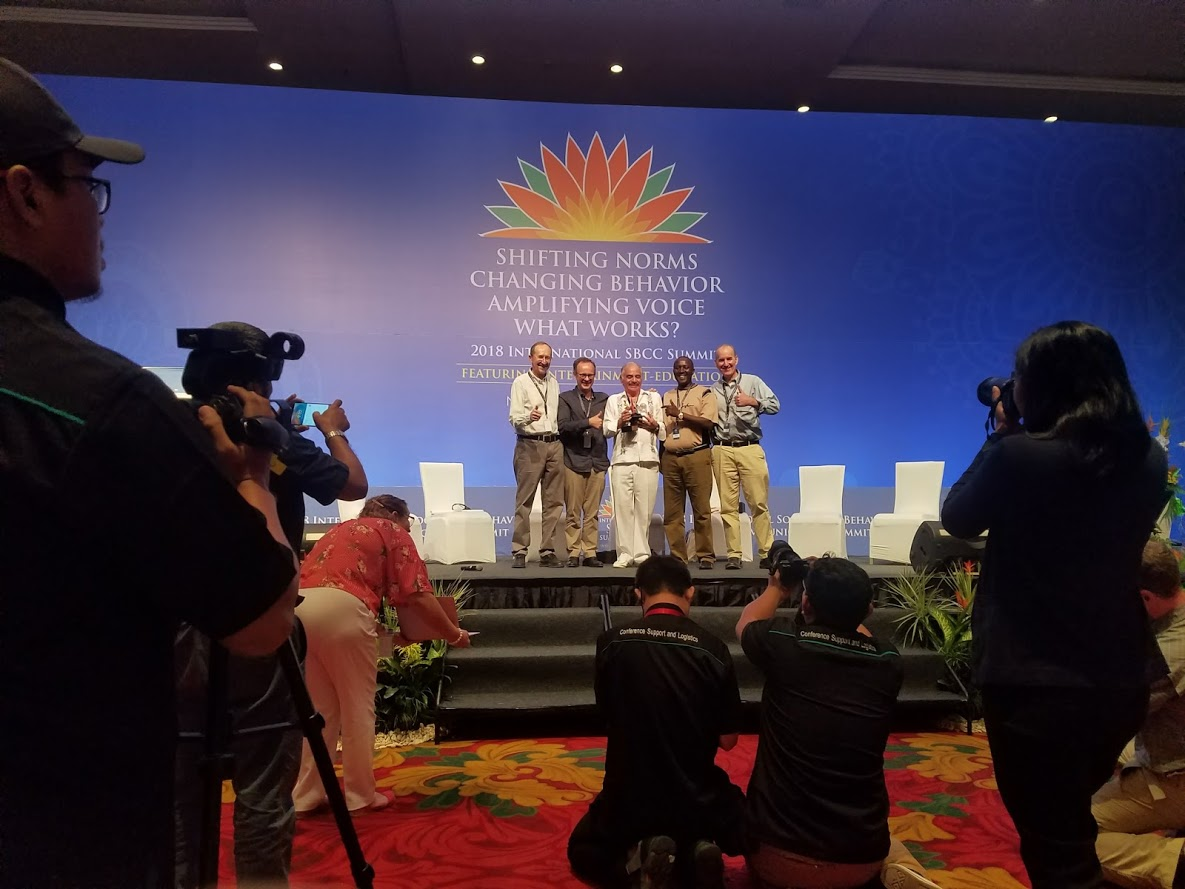
Miguel Sabido (center) being honored by the Population Media Center (PMC) and Population Communications International (PCI Media) with a Lifetime Achievement Award at the SBCC Summit 2018. Patrick Coleman, who coined the term "Entertainment-Education", is on the left.

While the field has evolved in the last 50 years, it is still strongly based on Sabido's specific approach. Nowadays, many practitioners in Entertainment-Education come from a background of public health, health communication and behavior change communication.

Sabido pioneered his method in 1967 by leveraging the Mexican tabloid Casos de Alarma to encourage readers to join the social security system of Mexico. The release of the Peruvian telenovela Simplemente María (1969) validated his assumptions about using mass media for social change, as the sale of sewing machines increased dramatically after the telenovela aired. Sabido went on to produce Ven conmigo, which was widely successful with a 32-point share and resulted in a million people enrolling in the adult education system of Mexico after the series' 1-year runtime. The Sabido-produced, family planning-themed telenovelas Acompáñame, Vamos juntos, caminemos and Nosotros los Mujeres followed soon after in the 1970s, which collectively resulted in a 34 percent decline of the population growth rate of Mexico.

The United Nations awarded Mexico with their Population Prize after that run; United States Agency for International Development's Thomas Donnelly wrote: "The Televisa family planning soap operas have made the single most powerful contribution to the Mexican population success story." David Poindexter of Population Communications International saw great promise in this approach, and introduced him to US-American psychologist Albert Bandura. Bandura was able to explain some of Sabido's enormous impact through his social learning theory and later went on to publish many papers on the effects of serial (radio and television) dramas.

In a series of strategic meetings in the 1970s and 1980s, Poindexter invited Sabido to teach his method world-wide in India, China, the Philippines, Egypt, and the Netherlands. Together with Sonny Fox, the president of the National Academy of Television Arts and Sciences, they then organized so-called "Soap Summits" that brought together the CEOs of large American broadcasters, as well as introduce American TV writers to the methods of Entertainment-Education.

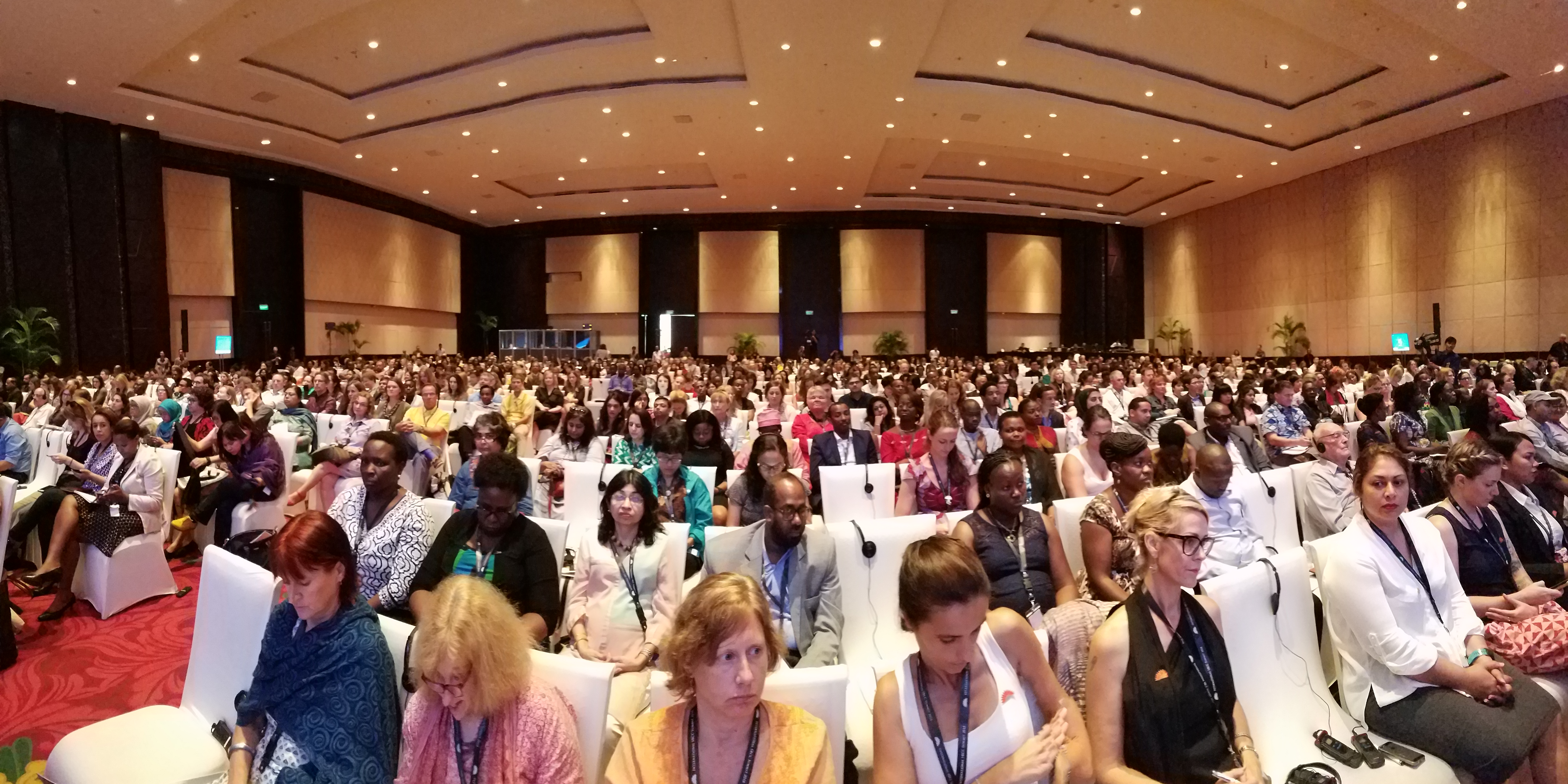
Over 1,200 attendees came to the 2018 SBCC Summit, where Entertainment-Education was a main topic among Social and Behavior Change Communication professionals.

Since the early days in the 1980s, a number of organizations have flourished, led by Poindexter-heritage non-profits PCI Media and Population Media Center on the actively producing side, jointly having made 140 shows that reached more than 2 billion people and had enormous impact on prevention of HIV/AIDS, family planning and women's rights.

In an effort to systematize health communications in Hollywood content and under leadership of Sonny Fox and Norman Lear, the Centers for Disease Control and Prevention teamed up with USC Annenberg School for Communication and Journalism, jointly creating Hollywood, Health and Society. HH&S advises Writers Guild of America West writers in the inclusion of health-related topics in mainstream television and film.

== See also ==
- Drama as a tool for education
- Educational video game
- Educational entertainment
- Educational software
- Johns Hopkins University Center for Communication Programs
- Kami (Takalani Sesame)
- Miguel Sabido
- Participant Media
- Politainment
- Population Media Center
- Public service announcement
- Social and behavior change communication
- Social impact entertainment
- Telenovelas
