= David Poindexter =

American Methodist minister, family planning advocate (1929–2018)

- Born: January 30, 1929; Hood River, Oregon
- Died: February 8, 2018 (aged 89)
- Occupation(s): Methodist minister, family planning advocate, TV producer
- Years active: 1970–1998

David Poindexter (January 30, 1929 – February 8, 2018) was the founder of Population Communications International, a Methodist minister, and a TV producer.

After receiving a master's degree in theology and serving as a pastor for 8 years in Portland, Oregon, he moved to New York City in 1965 to take a post as director of utilization of the NCC's Broadcasting and Film Commission, and also became director of promotion services. It was in the late 1960s that Poindexter became interested in population growth issues and family planning solutions after reading The Population Bomb by Paul Ehrlich.

After realizing that Mexico needed family planning efforts, he met with then-president of Televisa Emilio Azcárraga Milmo (also present at the meeting was future President of the United States George H. W. Bush and John D. Rockefeller) and pleaded with him to include programming that would promote family planning. Azcarraga said they were already doing exactly that – and introduced Poindexter to Miguel Sabido. Poindexter saw the value in this evidence-based media approach and took Sabido around the globe to spread his methodology and teach others the methods of Entertainment-Education. Having mastered this formal methodology, he founded the NGO Population Communications International in 1985, and grew it to significant influence, producing thousands of TV episodes over the years.

Poindexter continuously worked the U.S. entertainment sector, formally teaming up with Sonny Fox. They jointly organized annual awards ceremonies to recognize the best entertainment shows addressing those issues. He formed a close relationship with Norman Lear and is credited as having the character of "Maude" go through a mid-life abortion. Poindexter was a significant force in lobbying and advocacy for using Entertainment-Education to benefit populations around the world, both in front of private broadcasters and councils of the United Nations, chairing multiple U.N. NGO committees on population issues.

David Poindexter retired in 1998 from his leadership positions and took an advisory position with Population Media Center, then newly founded by his longtime mentee Bill Ryerson.

He died on February 8, 2018, in Portland, Oregon after suffering a stroke. Coincidentally, on the same day and 900 miles south of his deathbed, the Producers Guild of America co-hosted its first social impact entertainment event with Hollywood, Health and Society — an organization that Poindexter laid the groundwork for. This event marked the "birth date" of the PGA Social Impact Entertainment Task Force.

== See also ==
- Albert Bandura
- Emilio Azcárraga Milmo
- Family Planning
- Miguel Sabido
- Social and Behavior Change Communication
- Sonny Fox
