= Population Media Center =

- Motto: Acting for Change
- Established: 1998
- Focus: Entertainment-Education and Social Impact Education for international development
- President: Bill Ryerson
- Location: South Burlington, Vermont, United States
- Website: www.populationmedia.org

Population Media Center (PMC) is an educational entertainment organization dedicated to women's rights and empowerment, population stabilization, and the environment.

PMC's headquarters staff and offices are located throughout the United States and abroad, including Los Angeles, Montreal, and Cape Town, with the primary office located in South Burlington, Vermont.

== History ==
PMC was founded in 1998 by William Ryerson to address population and reproductive health issues using the Sabido method. The company received funding from the Mulago Foundation in 2010.

== Organization ==
=== Activities ===
==== US Content Studio ====
In the United States, PMC develops and produces original content designed to entertain and address contemporary social issues, including women and girl's empowerment, reproductive health, and environmental sustainability. PMC's series, East Los High, was one of the top five shows on Hulu during its first season and 27,000+ viewers used a Planned Parenthood widget in the first month of release.

==== International Programs ====
PMC hires local writers, actors, and production staff, as well as administrative staff, to create powerful radio and TV serial dramas for behavior change.

Since its inception, PMC has aired its shows in Argentina, Bolivia, Brazil, Burkina Faso, Burundi, Chile, Colombia, Costa Rica, Democratic Republic of the Congo, Dominican Republic, Eastern Caribbean, Ecuador, El Salvador, Ethiopia, Guatemala, Haiti, Honduras, Ivory Coast, Jamaica, Kenya, Kyrgyzstan, Malawi, Mali, Mexico, Nepal, Nicaragua, Niger, Nigeria, Papua New Guinea, Panama, Paraguay, Peru, Philippines, Puerto Rico, Rwanda, Senegal, Sierra Leone, South Africa, Sudan, Swaziland, United States of America, Uganda, Uruguay, Venezuela, Vietnam, Zambia and Zimbabwe.

=== Leadership ===
PMC's board of directors has included leading proponents of family planning, gender equality and reproductive health, as well as writers, producers and executives of network television and independent film companies.

Notable board members include:

- Anne H. Ehrlich and Paul R. Ehrlich (co-authors of the 1968 book The Population Bomb)
- Tom Sawyer (former Congressional Representative from Ohio)

=== Funding ===
As a registered nonprofit 501(c)(3) organization, PMC receives donations from corporations, individuals, philanthropic organizations and government agencies. Donors include:

- American Psychological Foundation
- Arcus Foundation
- Atkinson Foundation
- Biodiversity and Sustainability Fund
- Carlos Slim Institute of Health
- Colcom Foundation
- Colgate-Palmolive
- Combined Federal Campaign
- Covington & Burling
- Danish International Development Agency (DANIDA)
- David and Lucile Packard Foundation
- Drucker Institute
- Ecotrust
- Anne and Paul R. Ehrlich
- Jewish Communal Fund
- Minneapolis Foundation
- Mulago Foundation
- Nirvana Mañana Institute
- Oak Foundation
- Population Services International
- Round Hill Fund
- Save the Children Norway
- UCLA Fielding School of Public Health
- UNICEF
- United Nations
- United Nations Population Fund (UNFPA)
- United States Agency for International Development (USAID)
- United States Fish and Wildlife Service
- Wallace Global Fund

== See also ==
- Entertainment-Education
- Miguel Sabido
- Public service announcement
- Social and Behavior Change Communication
- Social Impact Entertainment
- Telenovelas
- East Los High
- Vencer el miedo
