= HIV/AIDS in Laos =

Since the first HIV/AIDS case in Laos was identified in 1990, the number of infections has continued to grow. In 2005, UNAIDS estimated that 3,700 people in Laos were living with HIV.

== Prevalence ==
Laos currently faces a concentrated epidemic with an adult HIV prevalence of 0.42 percent as of 2024. The low HIV prevalence does not necessarily indicate low risk. Moreover, the HIV prevalence rate is increasing. Because of its geographical location in the heart of the Mekong region, injecting drug use, and unsafe sexual practices, Laos is in danger of an expanded epidemic. Nearly 5 percent of injecting drug users (IDUs) were found to be HIV-positive in 2005. Although only 0 to 1.1 percent of sex workers were HIV-infected in 2000, a 2004 survey of the prevalence of sexually transmitted infections (STIs) among service women found that chlamydia/gonorrhea prevalence was 45 percent in the capital Vientiane, 43.6 percent in the border province of Bokeo, and 27.9 percent in the southern province of Champasak, indicating the vulnerability of these women to HIV.

Laos is undergoing rapid socioeconomic changes, including increased international tourism, leading to sexual behaviors that may place some Laotians at increased risk for HIV infection. For instance, a report cited by UNAIDS found increasing sexual activity among young men in Vientiane in 2004, nearly 60 percent of whom reported having multiple partners in the first six months of the year and more than one-third of whom reported paying for sex. Many of Laos’s men who have sex with men (MSM) also report having sex with women. Women are considered to be particularly vulnerable to HIV/AIDS because of their low literacy, education, and health status. Women whose husbands have multiple sex partners and visit sex workers are particularly vulnerable.

Compounding Laos's vulnerability to an expanding HIV epidemic is a low level of knowledge about the disease among the general population. According to one study reported in the World Bank-sponsored Laos Gender Profile, 23 percent of respondents did not know that HIV was transmissible by blood, and more than half did not know that it could be transmitted from mother to child during pregnancy and breastfeeding. Implementing programs to increase knowledge and awareness is difficult in Laos because the country is home to 47 different ethnic groups with multiple native languages and a variety of cultures.

According to the World Health Organization, Laos had 69 new tuberculosis (TB) cases per 100,000 people in 2005, one of the highest incidence rates in the region. Although HIV-TB co-infection is relatively low, with only 0.7 percent of new TB cases occurring among HIV-infected individuals, the country is in danger of a combined epidemic. HIV-TB co-infection poses a challenge to providing treatment and care for both diseases.

== National Response ==
The Laos government initiated its response to the HIV/AIDS epidemic in 1992, when participants at an AIDS conference agreed that the spread of HIV was inevitable and would likely occur via young male urban or international migrants who returned to their villages and via women who became commercial sex workers out of economic necessity. The National Committee for the Control of AIDS is in charge of policy matters related to HIV/AIDS prevention and control. The committee consists of 14 members from 12 government ministries. The National Action Plan on HIV/AIDS/STIs for 2006–2010 focussed on achieving universal access to treatment, care and support.

The National Socioeconomic Development Plan for 2006–2010 addressed HIV/AIDS, indicating the government’s commitment to expanding the national response. Since implementing the plan, national authorities have worked to target people most likely to be exposed to the disease; scale up prevention, treatment, care and support; and improve strategic information. Activities to fight HIV/AIDS, including Behavior Change Communication (BCC) interventions, peer education, life skills training, and a 100 percent condom use program, have been integrated into Laos’s general development programs. The Ministry of Education is promoting HIV/AIDS and sex education by training school principals and teachers in these areas, so they can transfer their knowledge to students. The objective is to reduce risky sexual behavior to help keep down the number of new HIV infections in the country. According to UNAIDS, as of 2005, 49 percent of HIV-infected women and men were receiving antiretroviral therapy.

Laos receives support in its response to HIV/AIDS from various international donors, including the Global Fund to Fight AIDS, Tuberculosis and Malaria. The Global Fund approved a sixth-round grant from Laos to scale up HIV/AIDS prevention, care, and treatment in 2006.
