= Social impact entertainment =

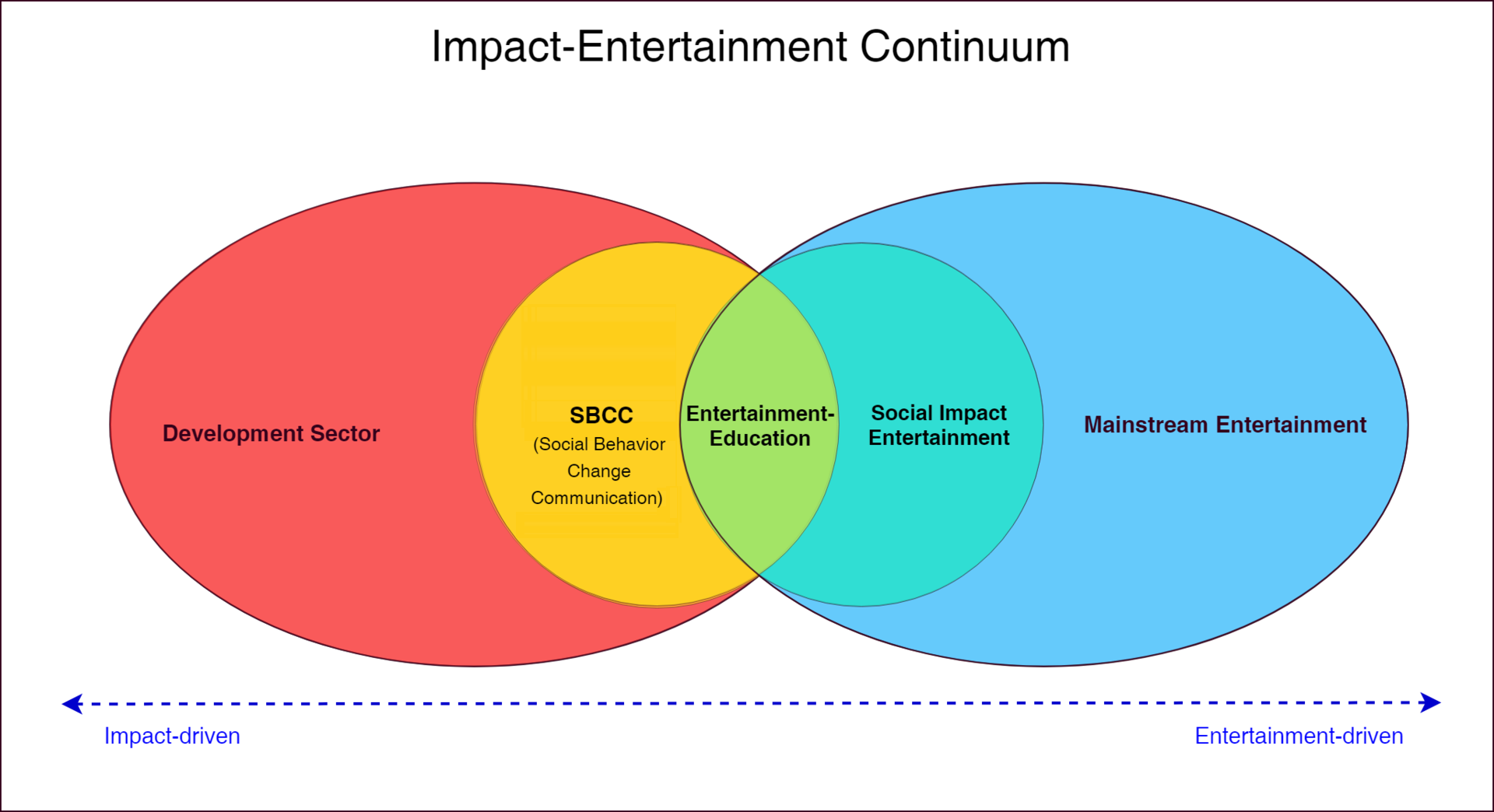
Social Impact Entertainment on the Development-Entertainment spectrum, with its closest neighbor Entertainment-Education

Social impact entertainment (SIE) is "all storytelling that is self-aware of its potential impact on its audiences and incorporates that knowledge to effect positive change at the individual, local, or global scale on one or more social issues", as defined by the SIE Society.

The practitioners in this field are predominately producers and directors who want to add a "social surplus" to their entertainment, as contrasted to the field of Entertainment-Education which often starts out with a social change directive and then creates the entertainment around it.

The topic is explored in the book, The Power of Storytelling: Social Impact Entertainment written by Robert Rippberger.

== Overview ==
A focus in the field is the study of actual effects (impact measurement), while the predominant interest is still to create entertaining, profitable content and work within the ecosystem of commercial film production and distribution. A common theme in the field of SIE is that mainstream film production companies employ so-called "Impact Producers" who specialize in impact-oriented distribution campaigns which can often include community screenings, screenings for legislators as well as impact measurement and evidence-building.

Unlike many other aspects of the mainstream entertainment industry, SIE tries to be scientific at times in its decision-making and frameworks; most notably building upon the work of Albert Bandura by utilizing social cognitive theory, and the work of TV producer Miguel Sabido, a contemporary of Bandura's, who pioneered large-scale television shows that used role modeling as "entertainment with a proven social benefit". SIE usually works with a "Theory of Change" on how the entertainment property will generate social impact and how said impact should be evaluated; this is usually preceded by extensive research on the issue, the stakeholders and past approaches for solving the issue at hand.

== Current Landscape ==
The most comprehensive overview over the field of Social Impact Entertainment, a report titled "The State of SIE", was published in March 2019 by the Skoll Center for SIE; it features sections such as "What is SIE", applications in narrative film, documentary film, theater, television, and "emerging forms". Similar to the "Cinema of Change Ecosystem", the State of SIE report features a "SIE Map", a mindmap-like structure that gives an overview of the field and its pioneers, participants and products. The report purposefully does not define the field of SIE.

Cinema of Change, a magazine and podcast dedicated to the field, reports on progress in the Social Impact Entertainment world since 2014. Currently, there are approximately 130 organizations, companies and film festivals operating in the Ecosystem, the most notable being Participant Media due to its $100 million+ funding and explicit mission in SIE. In 2020, Cinema of Change created a joint venture with the Social Impact Entertainment Task Force of the Producers Guild of America and launched SIE Society to bring together stakeholders in the otherwise largely silo-ed and fragmented space.

Social impact entertainment is taught at a few universities and has taken foot with a handful of institutes, most notably University of Southern California's Norman Lear Center and UCLA TFT's Skoll Center for Social Impact Entertainment. The idea of this center came to Teri Schwartz in 2003, then a university dean; in 2007 she shared the idea with Jeffrey Skoll who was starting Participant Media at the time, and in 2014, once Schwartz had become the Dean of UCLA's film school, he donated $10 Million to create the center.

The Producers Guild of America launched its own initiative in the summer of 2018 - the PGA SIETF (Producers Guild of America Social Impact Entertainment Task Force). The task force concentrates on educating the PGA membership in impact matters as well as organizing interdisciplinary events for producers working with impact-oriented projects in the fields of film, television, gaming and interactive media. During the PGA's flagship Produced By conference in 2019, the SIETF hosted a sold-out panel featuring Michael B. Jordan and impact producers, focusing exclusively on Social Impact Entertainment.

SIE has a different approach to generating impact when compared to Social and behavior change communication (SBCC), namely putting story and characters first, and shaping the impact around an existing intellectual property - rather than creating it from scratch for the sole purpose of impact.

== See also ==
- SBCC (Social Behavior Change Communication)
- The Power of Storytelling: Social Impact Entertainment — Book
- David Poindexter
- Educational entertainment
- Entertainment-Education
- Jeffrey Skoll
- Participant Media
- Miguel Sabido
- Population Media Center
- Skoll Center for Social Impact Entertainment
- Sonny Fox
