= Phyllis Tilson Piotrow =

American academic

Dr. Phyllis Tilson Piotrow
- Born: 1933 (age 92–93); New York City, New York, US

Academic background
- Education: St Anne's College, Oxford

Academic work
- Main interests: Population problems, Communication programs

Phyllis Tilson Piotrow (born 1933) is an American academic. She is the founder and former first director of the Johns Hopkins University Center for Communication Programs.

== Career and education ==
Phyllis Tilson Piotrow graduated summa cum laude from Bryn Mawr College in 1954 with honors in history before going on to study at St Anne's College, Oxford as a Marshall Scholar. In 1956, she graduated Bachelor in Modern History with first class honours and Master of Arts in 1959.. From 1960 to 1965 she served as a Legislative Assistant to US Senator Kenneth B. Keating of New York.

In 1971 she became Doctor of Philosophy in Political Science and Population Dynamics from Johns Hopkins University in 1971. Piotrow founded the Center for Communication Programs at the Bloomberg School of Public Health at Johns Hopkins University and served as Director until 2001. She retired as a tenured professor. She had served for many years as the founding Executive Director of Population Action International (PAI) as well as chairing the Population and Family Planning section of the American Public Health Association.

Piotrow has been a consultant to the United Nations, to the United States Agency for International Development (USAID) and to the US Government during the 1974 World Population Conference in Bucharest, Romania.

== Publications ==
- World Population: The Present And Future Crisis
- World Population Crisis: the United States' Response
- Six Billion People: Demographic Dilemmas and World Politics (with George P. Tapinos)
- Health Communication: Lessons from Family Planning and Reproductive Health (with D. Lawrence Kincaid, Jose G. Rimon)
- Strategies For Family Planning Promotion
- Family Planning: Improving Opportunities for Women

== See also ==
- D. Lawrence Kincaid
