= Miguel Sabido =

Mexican telenovela producer

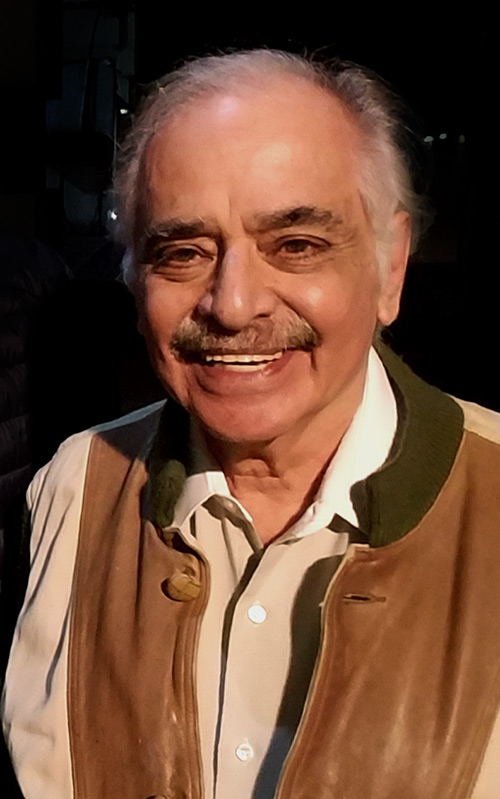
- Sabido in 2018
- Born: November 20, 1937 (age 87); Mexico City
- Occupation(s): Producer, writer, researcher, theorist
- Years active: 1964–present

Miguel Sabido (born 1937) is a producer, writer, researcher, and theorist, known for pioneering Entertainment-Education, developing the "Theory of the Tone", and producing a number of commercially successful telenovelas for Televisa in the 1970s.

== Biography ==
After being trained as a theater director and producer, Sabido discovered his "Theory of the Tone" as he was working with theater actors. The theory states that an actor can change not only their own delivery of dialogue and their associated body language, but the emotional resonance, the "tone" of the entire audience. Convinced that he could apply this method more widely, he tested it in 1967 by leveraging the readership of the Mexican tabloid Casos de Alarma. He inserted content that would encourage readers to join the social security system of Mexico, assuming that low-brow entertainment would be a great way to spread public benefit messages. The campaign showed positive effects but was criticized by the Mexican academic community for being "not academically sound".

The release of the Peruvian telenovela Simplemente María validated Sabido's assumptions, as the sale of sewing machines increased dramatically after the telenovela aired. Being an active TV producer, he teamed up with then-president of Televisa, Emilio Azcárraga Milmo, who challenged him to apply his "Theory of the Tone" to Televisa's TV programming sequence ("Carry-Over Curve"). Being enormously successful in this effort, Azcarraga gave Sabido an unprecedented level of access and power within Televisa, making him the Vice President of Research and eventually allowing him to produce six mainstream telenovelas.

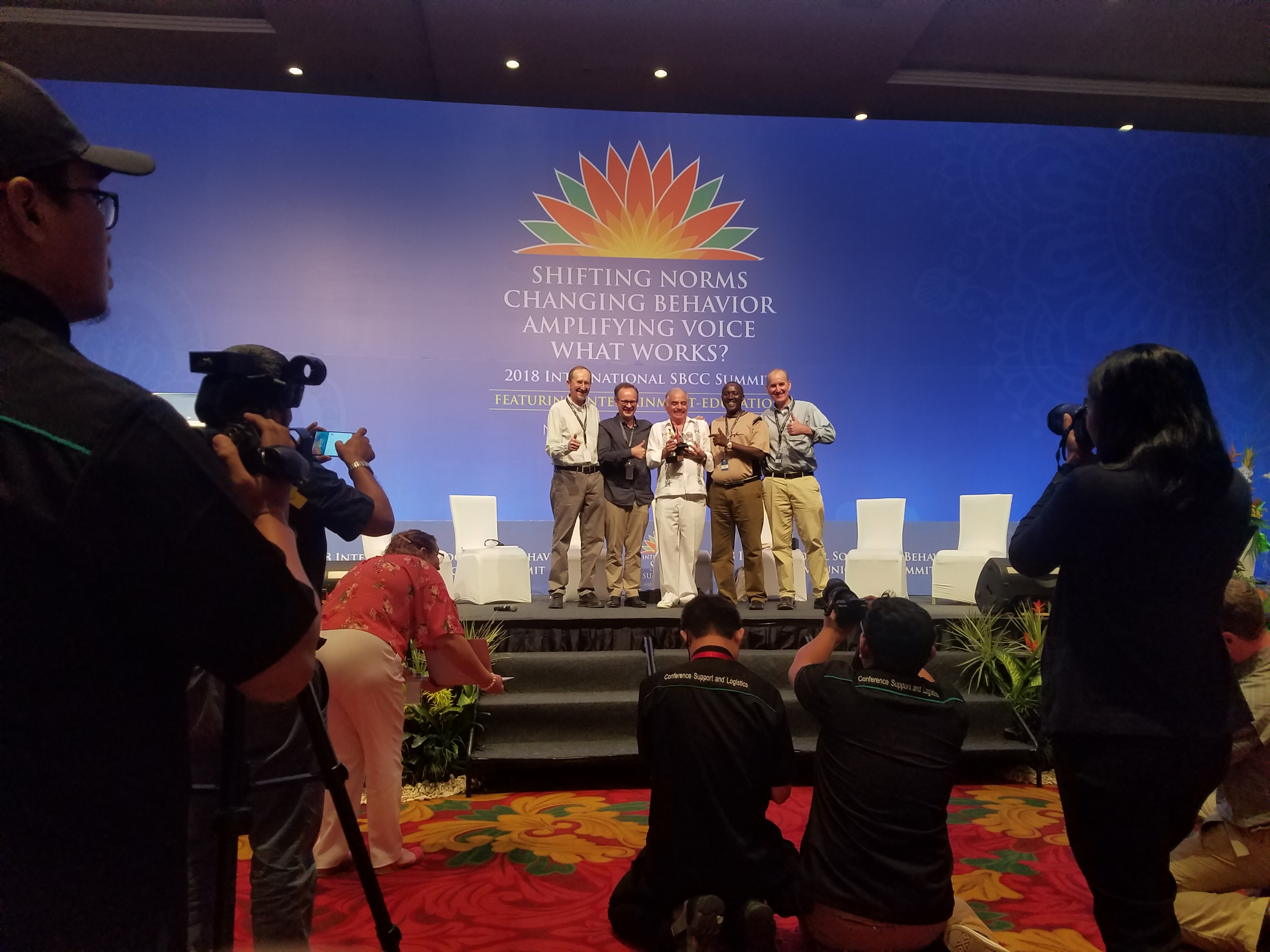
Miguel Sabido receiving multiple lifetime awards for his work in Entertainment-Education during the SBCC Summit 2018 in Bali, Indonesia.

The first of its kind was Ven conmigo, which was widely successful with a 32-point share and resulted in a million people enrolling in the adult education system of Mexico after the series' 1-year runtime. By then, Sabido had formalized his approach, calling it "Entertainment with a proven social benefit", which would later become Entertainment-Education as it spread around the globe.

Sabido went on to produce the family planning-themed telenovelas Acompáñame, Vamos juntos, Caminemos, and Nosotros los Mujeres in the 1970s, which collectively resulted in a 34 percent decline of the population growth rate of Mexico.

The United Nations awarded Mexico with their Population Award; the United States Agency for International Development's Thomas Donnelly wrote: "The Televisa family planning soap operas have made the single most powerful contribution to the Mexican population success story." Albert Bandura became an instrumental ally to Sabdio, explaining some of the enormous impact through his social learning theory and later going on to publish many papers on the effects of serial dramas.

David Poindexter of Population Communications International saw great promise in this approach, and in a series of strategic meetings, he invited Sabido to teach his method worldwide in India, China, the Philippines, Egypt, and the Netherlands. Since then, Sabido has trained hundreds of producers and writers around the world in his method, which resulted in the formation of multiple non-profits and millions of dollars invested in Entertainment-Education programs around the globe, collectively reaching more than 2 billion beneficiaries.

== See also ==
- Albert Bandura
- David Poindexter
- Drama as a tool for education
- Emilio Azcárraga Milmo
- Population Communications International
- Population Media Center
- Social and Behavior Change Communication
- Social Impact Entertainment
- Sonny Fox
- Telenovelas
- Televisa
