= Educational entertainment =

Media designed to educate through entertainment

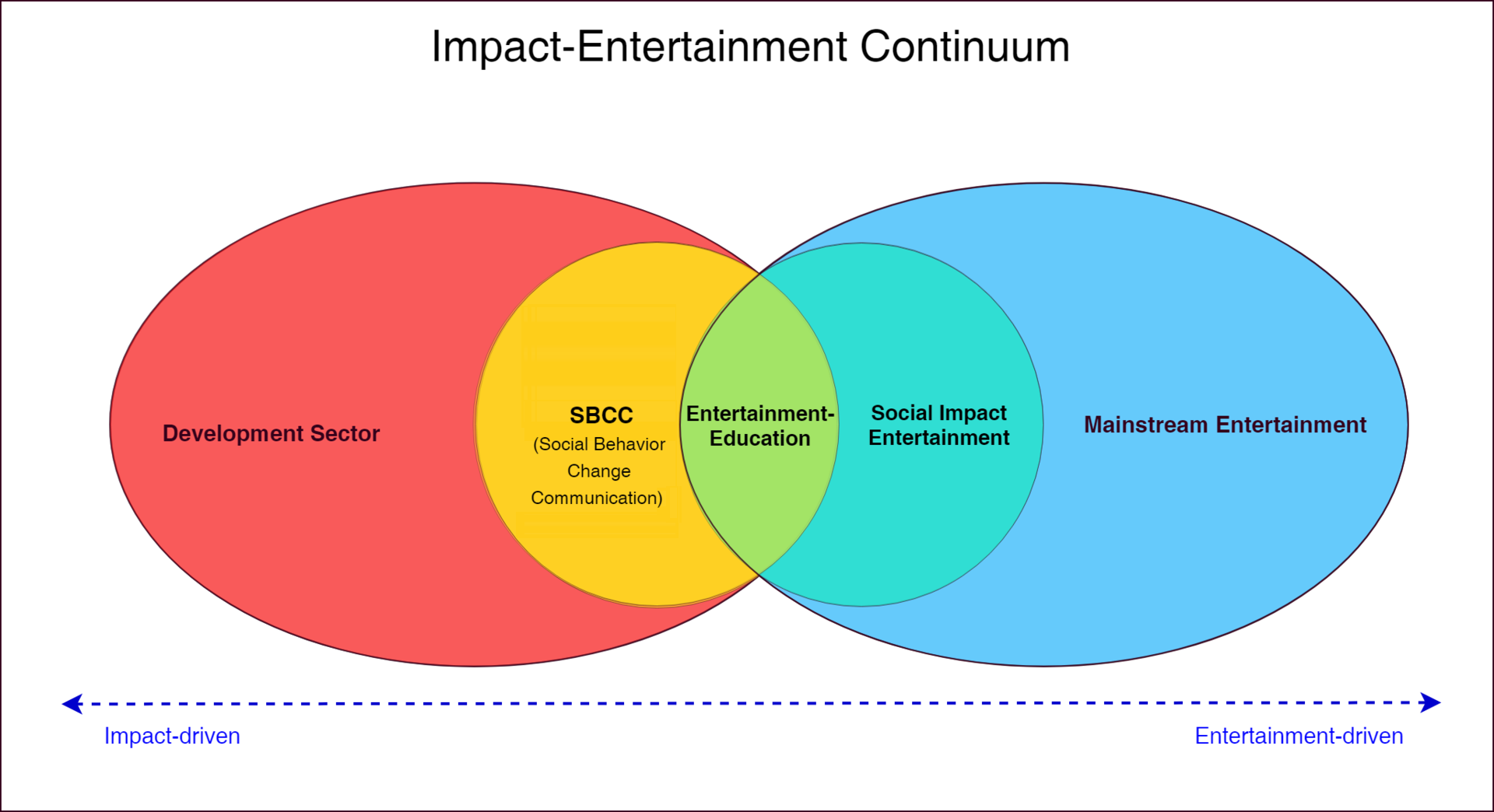
A Venn diagram on educational entertainment

Educational entertainment, also referred to by the portmanteau edutainment, is media designed to educate through entertainment. The term has been used as early as 1933. Most often it includes content intended to teach but has incidental entertainment value. It has been used by academia, corporations, governments, and other entities in various countries to disseminate information in classrooms and/or via television, radio, and other media to influence viewers' opinions and behaviors.

== History ==
=== Concept ===
Interest in combining education with entertainment, especially in order to make learning more enjoyable, has existed for hundreds of years, with the Renaissance and Enlightenment being movements in which this combination was presented to students. Komenský in particular is affiliated with the "school as play" concept, which proposes pedagogy with dramatic or delightful elements.

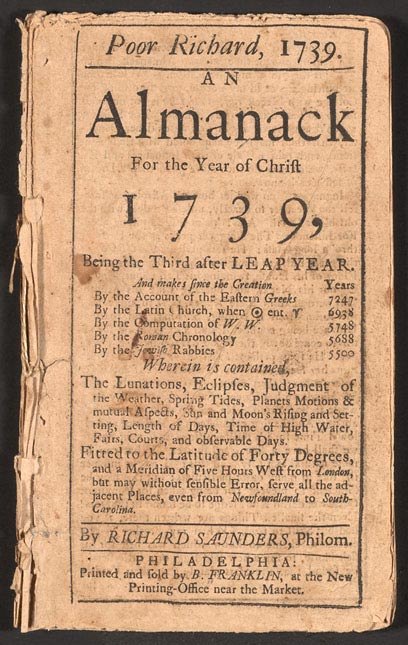
Poor Richard's Almanack

Poor Richard's Almanack demonstrates early implementation of edutainment, with Benjamin Franklin combining entertaining and educational content, such as puzzles and rules of conduct, into an instructional entity for colonists.

Later development of the concept of edutainment can be tied to Walt Disney, with his first educational short film, Tommy Tucker's Tooth, being commissioned and shot in 1922 for the Deneer Dental Institute. The entry of the U.S. into World War II also had a major impact on the popularity of educational entertainment, as a relationship between Disney and the U.S. government formed; Disney was able to experiment with educational and nonfiction films in a way that continued even after the war, with series such as True-Life Adventures and Disneyland. In the transcript of an interview with Alexander P. de Seversky from The Walt Disney Archives, of which its date and interviewer is unknown, the following quotation is found:

It is a new kind of entertainment that goes far beyond simply "amusing" its audience. This picture is vital entertainment--it treats on a subject that directly affects every man, woman, and child, in America. With dramatic action it exposes the basic ideas that will rid the mind of confusion and clarify the war thinking of the public.

— Walt Disney, Interview with Alexander de Seversky

Since the 1970s, various groups in the United States, the United Kingdom, and Latin America have used edutainment to address health and social issues such as substance abuse, immunization, teenage pregnancy, HIV/AIDS, and cancer. Initiatives in major universities, such as Johns Hopkins Center for Communication Programs and the University of Wisconsin–Madison, NGOs such as PCI-Media Impact, and government agencies such as the U.S. Centers for Disease Control (CDC) have produced edutainment content.

Modern forms of edutainment include television productions, film, museum exhibits, and computer software which use entertainment to attract and maintain an audience, while incorporating deliberate educational content or messages. It is also apparent that educational elements are becoming implemented into traditionally recreational realms, such as vacations and games.

=== Terminology ===
The term edutainment has been used as early as 1933, with The Australian Women's Weekly describing it as a newly coined word in the broadcast industry for a genre of programming that blended radio lectures with elements of comedy shows. In 1954, Walt Disney used it to describe their True Life Adventures series. The noun edutainment is a neologistic portmanteau used by Robert Heyman in 1973 while producing documentaries for the National Geographic Society. It was used by Dr. Chris Daniels in 1975 to encapsulate the theme of his Millennium Project. This project later became known as The Elysian World Project. The terms "edutainment" (and "busitainment") were used in 2001 to explain how the CRUMPET project, on context-aware and personalised Tourism, refers to people travelling for adventure yet who also travel for education and business and who do not perceive themselves as classical "tourists". The offshoot word "Edutainer" has been used by Craig Sim Webb since before the turn of the millennium to describe an individual who offers edutainment presentations and performances.

== Application ==
=== Audio and video ===
Schoolhouse Rock, Wishbone, Sesame Street, and Bill Nye the Science Guy are examples of shows that use music and video to teach topics like math, science, and history. Using music to aid memory dates back to the passing of ancient oral traditions, including the Iliad and the Odyssey. Much of what edutainment can offer through audio and video especially, is accessible over the internet on platforms such as YouTube, with such channels as Vsauce, CGP Grey, MinutePhysics, Meet Arnold, Veritasium, and Crash Course.

Public Service Broadcasting is a band that incorporates audio and footage from the British Film Institute into their music and performances, and this partnership helps the British Film Institute showcase its material; their album Inform-Educate-Entertain, which covers topics such as the climbing of Mount Everest and highway safety, demonstrates the connection between the concept of edutainment and their music.

=== Film and television ===
Motion pictures with educational content appeared as early as 1943, such as Private Snafu, and can still be seen in films such as An Inconvenient Truth. After World War II, educational entertainment shifted towards television. Television programs can be divided into three main categories: those with primarily educational intentions, those with a high degree of both education and entertainment, and entertainment shows with incidental or occasional educational value.

Mexican TV producer Miguel Sabido pioneered in the 1970s a form of edutainment via telenovelas, "soap operas for social change". The "Sabido method" has been adopted in many other countries subsequently, including India, Peru, Kenya, and China. In Mexico, the government in the 1970s successfully used a telenovela to promote family planning to curb the country's high birth rate.

The third season of the television show MTV Shuga was analyzed by researchers and then published online in 2017 in terms of its effects related to its goal of educating African youth about sexual health and HIV, and secondarily, gender-based violence. In the randomized control trials, those in the treatment group who watched the show for six months were "almost twice as likely" to get tested at HIV testing centers; mixed results were found in regards to the show's effects on gender-based violence.

=== Healthcare ===
Educating the public about health issues is a focus for many stakeholders, including the pharmaceutical industry. In recent years, several initiatives have used educational entertainment principles to highlight specific conditions or wider healthcare issues. Examples include In Memory about dementia, Millefeuille about psoriasis and This is Axiom about the challenges facing the UK's National Health Service.

=== Games ===
Games fulfill a number of educational purposes. Some games may be explicitly designed with education in mind, while others may have incidental or secondary educational value. All types of games, including board, card, quizzes, and video games, may be used in an educational environment. Educational games are designed to teach people about certain subjects, expand concepts, reinforce development, understand an historical event or culture, or assist them in learning a skill as they play.

According to Paraskeva (2010), at least 68% of American households play video games. Many recent research articles postulate education and gaming can be joined to provide academic benefits.

According to Van Eck (2006), there are three reasons why games are considered learning tools: 1. Ongoing research that has included the last 20 years of educational findings have proven that digital games can be educational; 2. The new generation of today wants "multiple streams of information" (p. 1), which includes quick and frequent interaction that allows inductive reasoning; and 3. The mere popularity of games has created a billion-dollar industry. The idea of playing a game assumes the person is engaging in that activity by choice. The activity should have some value of "fun". This does not mean that the person is engaging in the activity only for leisure pursuits; it can also include the desire to learn a skill, connect with other gamers (social community), and spend time in a chosen activity. The activity needs to remain one of choice for the gamer.

Kim (2008) supports the use of off-the-shelf games with meta-cognitive strategies to provide an increase in students' cognitive performance.

=== Radio and podcasts ===
Radio can serve as an effective vehicle for educational entertainment. The British radio soap opera The Archers has for decades been systematically educating its audience on agricultural matters; likewise, the Tanzanian radio soap opera Twende na Wakati ("Let's Go With the Times") was written primarily to promote family planning.

Likewise, podcasts have begun to exemplify the concept of edutainment, with some radio programs also becoming available in this digital format. Not only are there series with educational elements that are listened to recreationally, but there are also podcasts used as educational tools. Lessons based on podcasts have increased in popularity, with TeachersPayTeachers finding that lesson plans relating to podcasts rose in downloads by 21 percent and 650 percent in 2014 and 2015, respectively, which corresponded with the release of Serial.

Other successful radio programs and/or podcasts that have fused entertainment and education include:

- DJ Nihal's BBC Radio 1 radio show which centered around 'edutainment'. He mentions this term each time the show is broadcast.
- "The Lawsons/Blue Hills" – a radio program that was designed to help Australian farmers adjust to new farming methods.
- "Tinka Tinka Sukh" – a Hindi-language radio program that results in environmental and health improvements in India.
- Soul City – A successful South African radio serial drama that carried AIDS prevention messages.
- The Donut Shop – A successful internet radio show talk about educational games that they think could be used in today's schools.
- Radio Ado and its radio-drama "Pildoritas de la Vida Real", a Mexican radio soap opera designed to disseminate sexual education among teenagers. This radio-drama was produced by the University of Guadalajara and teenagers from Morelia, Michoacan, Mexico.
- Khirki Mehendiwali – In an endeavour to improve maternal and child health practices in Bihar, a 37 episode long Radio Show Khirki Mehendiwali was created for the rural audience by BBC Media Action, India. Each approximately 15-minute episode beautifully blends information with entertainment to disseminate one specific message on maternal and child health. The show provides a window to the world to its rural listeners by not only giving them a glimpse of the world outside but also unlocking voices, feelings, dreams and information, which they had hitherto not heard or experienced.
- Freakonomics Radio — A radio program, which is also released as a podcast, in which the complexities of everyday life are discussed by the author and co-author of the corresponding book, Freakonomics.
- Invisibilia — The podcast series aspires to "explore the invisible forces that shape human behavior — things like ideas, beliefs, assumptions and emotions."
- RadioLab — A radio program, which is also available as a podcast, that combines the studies of science, philosophy, and human nature.
- Science Friday — A radio program that is also released as a podcast, which discusses science in a fun way.
- Stuff You Should Know — A podcast that educates listeners about various topics while employing a conversational tone.
- TED Radio Hour — A radio program and podcast that examines themes and ideas, using excerpts from TED Talks.

=== Toys ===
Toys are perhaps the earliest "edutainment" objects a person encounters, as many toys have also an educational aspect beside their aesthetic appeal. They can teach children literacy, numerical, conceptual or motor skills. Many toys (e.g., a miniature piano) are simply colorful, scaled-down versions of more complex objects, and thus can base children in skills and benefits associated with the latter. It is up to grown-ups to guide children to the toy's proper use in order to make the most out of it.

Toys are often employed in the context of mimicry and roleplay to partially experience personalities or situations not otherwise possible, very akin to simulation in video games. They can be used as primitive means to nurture an instinct or a character trait in children. Often, toys work simultaneously the other way, providing children with the means to express those things: a doll may be used by a girl to mimic her mother or express motherhood as much as to explore it.

Even for toys that don't possess explicit educational value, a thoughtful parent or teacher can turn a static figurine, for example, into an object of interest, by pointing out its features or costumes, or referring to its history or science (e.g., a figurine of a Native American may be a starting point for exploring American history; a Santa Claus may be used to explore the roots of Christmas; a toy astronaut to explore science...), which can be done in conjunction with a more-explicitly "edutaining" object, such as a picture book. Most children are naturally inquisitive (possibly why they sometimes break their toys; simply to know what is inside or how it moves or what produces that sound), and caregivers should not waste this opportunity.

Even grown-ups can learn through toys about children: what are their talents or interests; if they are more extrovert or introvert; indeed if they dislike toys and prefer social activities or sport, and thus capitalize on the children's abilities and correct what is wrong or lacking.

Some toys are of considerable appeal and benefit to both children and adults, such as Lego or Rubik's Cube, as their design and implementation can range from the simple to the sophisticated.

=== Hip hop culture ===
The term "edutainment" was first made popular amongst the hip hop community by KRS-One (a.k.a. The Teacha) thanks to his Boogie Down Productions album by the same name.

The term has since been borrowed to describe hip hop culture's innate pedagogical aesthetics. Examples of this include how Hip Hop uniquely combines both thought and action (see Paulo Freire's use of praxis in Pedagogy of the Oppressed) and values both Eurocentric values of rational thought and Afrocentric epistemology of kinetic, affective and emotional ways of knowing. Another example is in the transmission of technical and historical knowledge, the manner in which Hip Hop practitioners learn and exchange by sharing moments of performance together through building or building sessions.

=== Corporations ===
The concept of educational entertainment is being used for building learning programs for organizations. High technology is used to make the programs entertaining and educational. As an example, PowerPoint presentations may become more entertaining with the addition of flashy animations or graphics. An article in a satirical newspaper, The Onion, poked fun at the concept of embellishing boring presentations with attention-catching effects. A fictional marketing executive in the article noted the previous lack of excitement in the presentation, saying "When we first finished the PowerPoint, the content was all there, but it still lacked that certain something."

=== Theme parks ===
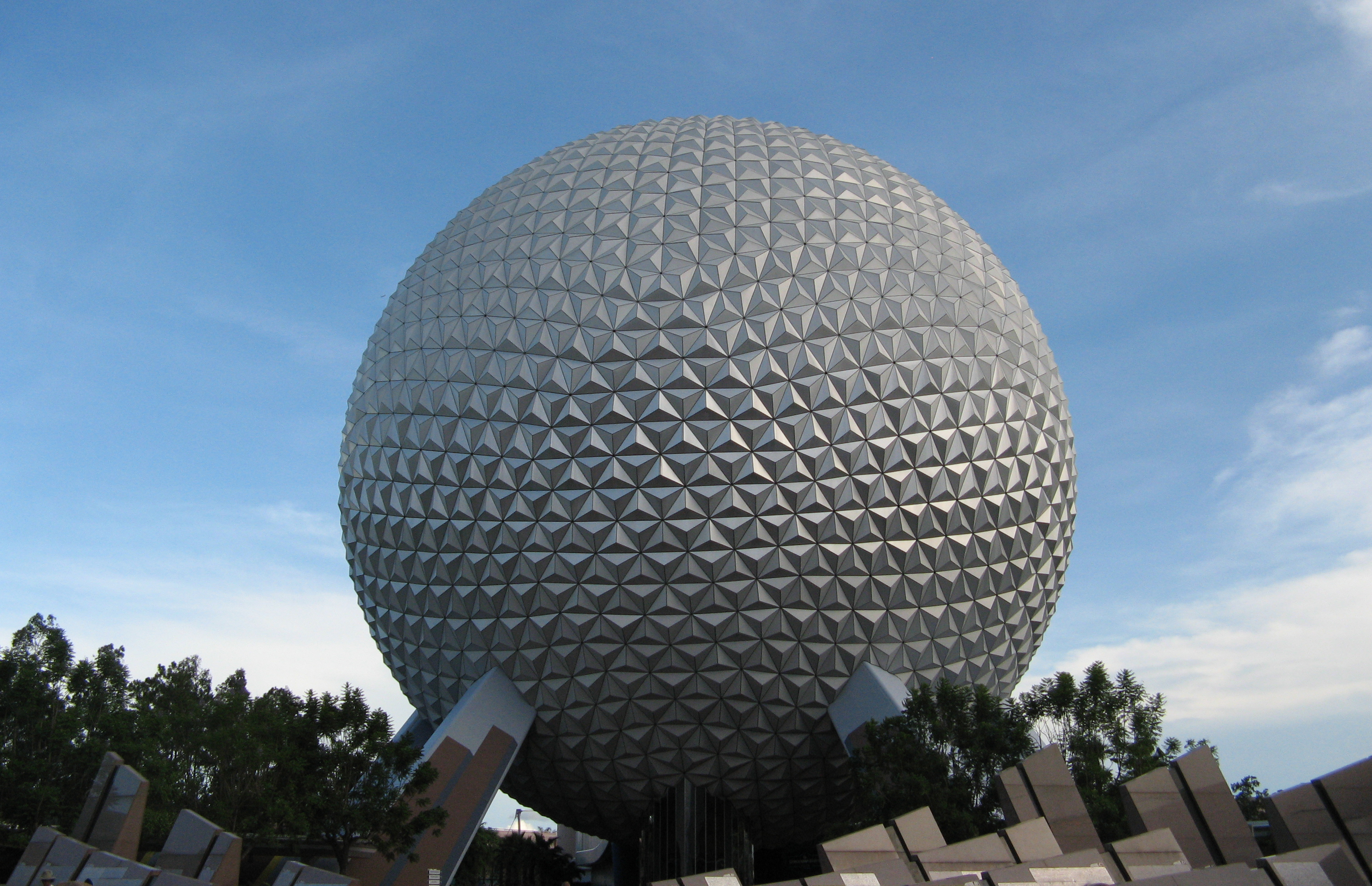
Spaceship Earth, an attraction at Epcot

Theme parks are a specific kind of setting in which the combination of entertaining and educational elements can be prevalent. Epcot at Walt Disney World, which is owned by The Walt Disney Company, is highly based on edutainment; the park features attractions that teach about the past, conservation, imagination, future technologies, and the world. The park's dedication plaque, written by Marty Sklar and Erwin Okun, states the following: "May EPCOT Center entertain, inform and inspire. And above all, may it instill a new sense of belief and pride in man's ability to shape a world that offers hope to people everywhere."

The offerings and promotions at SeaWorld associated with the educational topics of marine biology, conservation, and animal rescue efforts are increasing at their current locations and in plans for the upcoming Abu Dhabi theme park, which is likely due to activism for animal rights.

Other notable theme parks that incorporate educational elements and topics are Disney's Animal Kingdom, Holy Land Experience, Dinosaur World, Busch Gardens, and Puy du Fou.

=== Museums and public access areas ===
Edutainment is also a growing paradigm within the science center and children's museum community in the United States, as well as in many other locations such as the zoo or a botanical garden. Educational locations such as these are constantly looking for new and innovative ways to reach the surrounding public and get them interested in areas such as the fine arts, science, literature, and history. Additionally, field trip visits to these educational places provide participants with interactional stimulus to learn about the content offered there. Since people are used to flashy, polished entertainment venues like movie theaters and theme parks, they demand similar experiences at science centers or museums. Consequently, interactive experiences, such as games and mobile apps, are implemented in museums in order to more effectively help people learn about what they are seeing. Museums are also embracing the ability to use storytelling to engage people, especially those who are young, in hopes to increase attendance; all the while, though, it is possible for the focus and purpose of museums to be diluted. Thus, a museum or a zoo can be seen as just another business competing for entertainment dollars from the public, rather than as an institution that serves the public welfare through education or historical preservation.

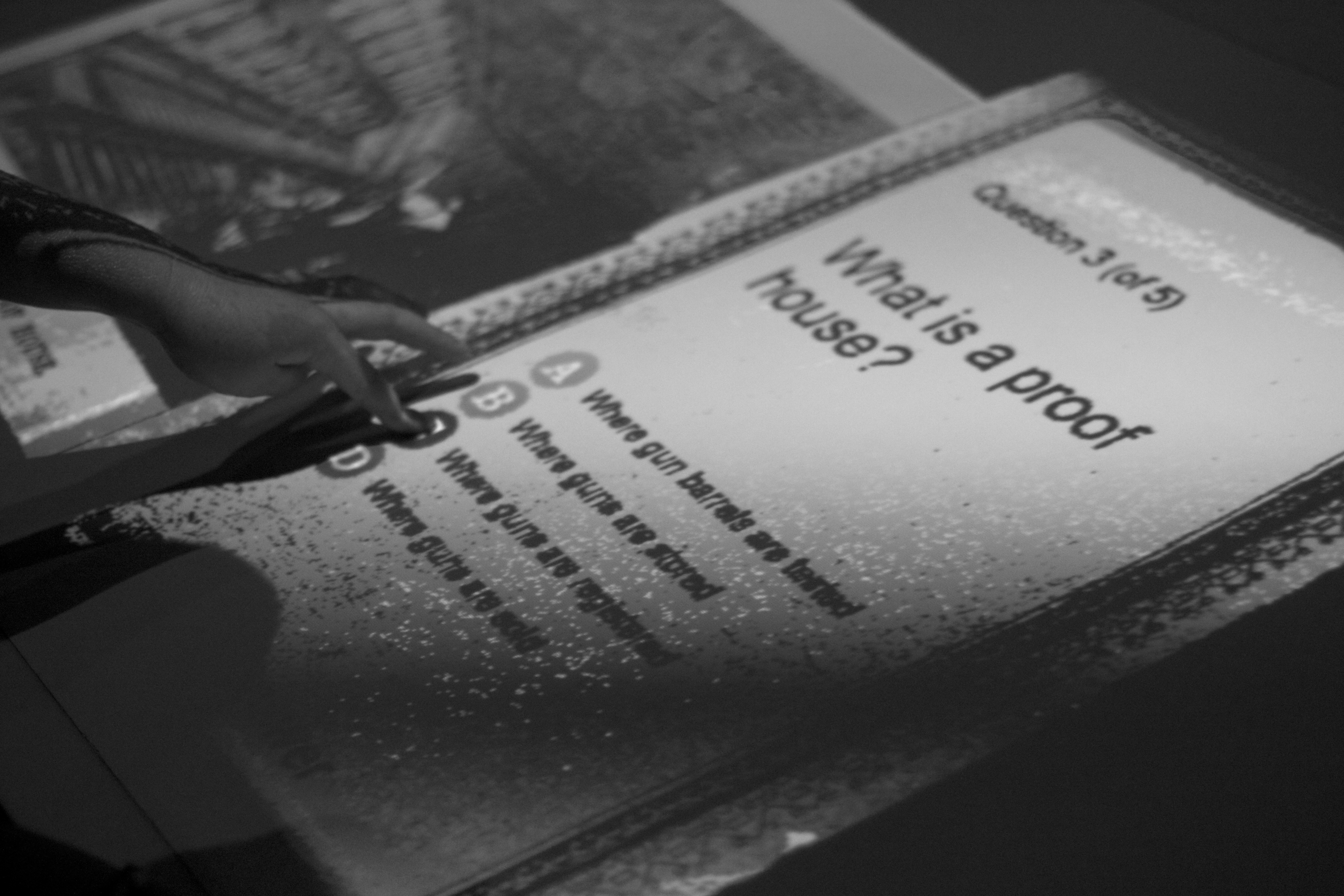
An interactive exhibit at the Museum of London

== Effects in the classroom ==
Much research has been done in association with edutainment and its effectiveness in its various forms. Particularly, the effects of the implementation of the concept of edutainment in the classroom setting have been studied on multiple occasions. The concept of flipped classrooms, in association with edutainment, was studied by Retta Guy and Gerald Marquis (2016), in which students were assigned video lessons and podcasts as opposed to projects prior to class; it was found that these students outperformed those in traditional classrooms, found the actual time in class to prompt more interaction, and thought the class to be more enjoyable, although there was a noticeable period of adaption.

In a study conducted by Ruby Lynch-Arroyo and Joyce Asing-Cashman (2016), Numb3rs, which is an example of edutainment in the form of a television show, was integrated into the education of preservice mathematics teachers. The subsequent results exemplified the potential for edutainment to promote critical thinking, increased engagement, and growth mindsets.

Similarly, Craig D. Cox, et al. (2017) conducted a study in which a mini-series that combined educational and entertaining elements was developed and presented to pharmacy preceptors; it was effective in increasing the confidence of the participants and was an honorable mention for the American Association of Colleges of Pharmacy Innovations in Teaching Award in 2015.

A system that incorporated the concept of edutainment through the use of games has also been studied in association with disabled students by Amal Dandashi, et al. (2015), and it was found that the system had a positive impact in terms of scores, coordination, communication, and memorization skills; after replaying, higher scores were often achieved as well.

As for podcasts and narration specifically, according to a study conducted by Trish L. Varao Sousa, Jonathan S. A. Carriere, and Daniel Smilek (2013) with student participants, these forms may not be particularly helpful, as their use can result in both less information actually internalized and less engagement overall when compared to other "reading encounters."

== Criticism ==
Debate regarding the value of educational entertainment and its implementation has been had for decades. The negative feedback received by Walt Disney for his True-Life Adventures series represents the views of some skeptics of the concept of edutainment. For example, the use of music along with the footage of animals, such as the circumstance in which "The courtship of tarantulas was set to a tango, while the movements of two scorpions were showcased with square dance music in the background" was criticized at the time; the purpose of the music was to enhance the footage, but some people took issue with this humanization. Additionally, without approval, some of the film crew of White Wilderness prompted unnatural behavior in lemmings that would be filmed, which then generated a negative response.

Sesame Street, a television show that demonstrates the concept of edutainment, has also specifically been subject to criticism. For instance, in an article published in The Atlantic in May 1971, John Holt criticizes the promotion of "Right Answers" in the television show without actual action being taken by the children, and also argues that it is nonsensical and perplexing to have adults convey to children that everything that is to be discovered is logical and easy to understand.

The argument that the concept of edutainment hurts the actual value of education has been prevalent as well. The book entitled Amusing Ourselves to Death by theorist Neil Postman demonstrates this notion, as it is claimed that areas of study have been "transformed into congenial adjuncts of show business." Museum professionals especially have faced this dilemma, as in study conducted by Pierre Balloffet, François H. Courvoisier, and Joëlle Lagier (2014), museum professionals did not have severe negative opinions of the incorporation of educational entertainment, but individuals nevertheless had varying viewpoints on "the appropriateness or potential risks of edutainment."

== See also ==
- After school special
- ChuChu TV
- Educational video game
- Educational toy
- Entertainment-Education
- Games and learning
- Historical reenactment
- Infotainment
- Educational software
- Kami (Takalani Sesame)
- Politainment
- Public service announcement
- Serious game
- Social Impact Entertainment
- Telenovelas
- Traffic School by Improv
