= Brian Kite =

American theater director

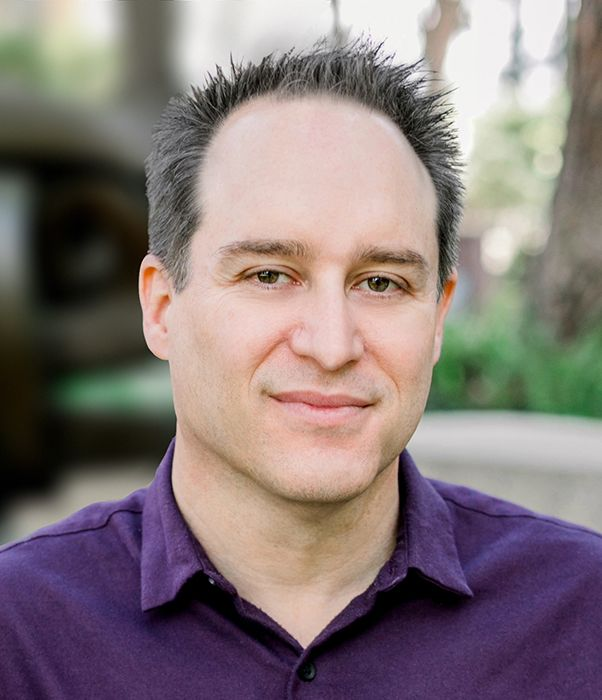
- Born: Chicago
- Occupations: Professor, Dean, and theater director

Academic background
- Education: University of California, Los Angeles

Brian Kite is an American theater director, professor, and university administrator. He is Dean and Vice Provost of Graduate Education at the University of California, Los Angeles. He is a Professor of Directing at UCLA. Kite previously served as dean of the UCLA School of Theater, Film and Television, and chair of the Department of Theater.

== Education ==
Kite received a Master of Fine Arts in directing and theatrical production at the University of California, Los Angeles.

== Career ==
Before joining UCLA full time, Kite was producing artistic director of La Mirada Theatre for the Performing Arts from 2008 to 2015.

Kite began teaching as a visiting associate professor at UCLA in October 2004. After 10 years of serving in that position, Kite was hired in 2015 as a full time faculty member and the Chair for UCLA Theater Department at University of California, Los Angeles School of Theater, Film and Television.

He has collaborated with The Adam Mickiewicz Institute to direct the musical Virtuoso and Irena in Poznań, Poland. Kite served as the Chair of the Board of Governors of the L.A. Stage Alliance, and holds an appointment as a visiting professor at the Shanghai Theatre Academy.

Kite is the recipient of the L.A.'s Ovation Award for Best Direction of a Musical for his production of Spring Awakening and was again nominated for his productions of Les Misérables and American Idiot.
