= Vamos juntos =

Mexican telenovela

- Genre: Telenovela
- Created by: Original Story: Estela Calderón; Miguel Sabido
- Directed by: Karlos Velázquez
- Starring: Silvia Derbez; Carlos Piñar
- Opening theme: "Vamos juntos" by Felipe Gil
- Country of origin: Mexico
- Original language: Spanish
- No. of seasons: 1
- No. of episodes: 20

Production
- Executive producer: Irene Sabido
- Cinematography: Marta Zavaleta; Carlos Tellez

Original release
- Network: Canal de las Estrellas
- Release: 1979

Vamos juntos is a Mexican telenovela produced by Irene Sabido for Televisa in 1979.

== Cast ==
- Silvia Derbez as Lupe Pistolas
- Anita Blanch as Rosa
- Macaria as María Elena
- Carlos Piñar as Claudio
- Enrique Rocha as Juan Cristobal
- Paola Jiménez Pons as Susanita
- Julieta Bracho as Florencia
- Chela Castro as Juana
- Cecilia Camacho as Gloria
- Rosenda Monteros as Otilia
- León Singer as Renato
- Milton Rodrigues as Mauro
- Rosario Gálvez as Catalina
- Luz María Aguilar as Isabel
- Roberto "Flaco" Guzmán as Arturo
- Tony Carbajal as Pedro
- Sofia Yosko as Comentadora
