= Centre for Communication Programs Nigeria =

- Abbreviation: CCPN
- Type: Non-Profit
- Location: Utako Nigeria
- Affiliations: Johns Hopkins Center for Communication Programs
- Website: http://ccpnigeria.org/

The Centre for Communication Programs Nigeria (CCPN) is a registered Nigerian organization specializing in the development and implementation of strategic health communication projects and programs. CCPN focuses on the central role of communication to impact health behavior, providing leadership and technical guidance in the field of strategic health communication. Supported by the Johns Hopkins Center for Communication Programs (JHUCCP) in Baltimore, CCPN was created as an innovative means to ensure the availability of high quality communication expertise in Nigeria and to support health and development programming. With an office in Abuja, CCPN has robust institutional capacity and human resources to effectively improve public health in Nigeria. CCPN is strategically positioned in Nigeria to implement strategic communication programs with the government of Nigeria, international donors, funders and non-governmental organizations focusing on the central role of communication in health behavior change in relevant health areas.

== Leadership in Strategic Health Communication (LSHC) ==
Since November 2008, CCPN has facilitated an annual Leadership in Strategic Health Communication (LSHC) training, bringing together participants from Nigeria and other countries with international and Nigerian health communication experts. This annual workshop is a cornerstone in CCPN's capacity building mission. More about LSHC can be viewed on the LSHC webpage

== Projects (Past and Current) ==
Nollywood Initiative for Enter-Educate Newman Street TV Series

Seeking opportunities to engage the vibrant Nigerian film industry, with support from JHUCCP, CCPN is taking the lead and coordinating Enter-Educate (EE) work with Nollywood. It is expected that this partnership will leave a lasting legacy in the EE industry in Nigeria and improve the quality of EE programming in Nigeria. ' Newman Street', an innovative TV Drama, set to tantalize and entertain the audience, creatively scripted and acted to address key health concerns facing all Nigerians, like malaria and family planning, features well-known and aspiring artists. The characters are captivating and their stories are powerful. Season one of Newman Street is made possible with additional support from UKaid, UNFPA and USAID/PMI. Visit the Newman Street Website

CCPN is a partner in this Gates-funded project led by JHU · CCP. CCPN provides technical assistance and on-the-ground support to the project's goal of developing interventions for creating demand for and sustaining use of contraceptives among marginalized urban populations.

CCPN is a project-implementing partner on (SuNMaP), a project funded by UK Department for International Development and led by Malaria Consortium. Working at the National level and in the 9 project states, CCPN brings strategic communication skills and technical expertise in program communication planning materials development to the project's comprehensive fight against malaria in Nigeria.

Networks Care and Repair Campaign

Networks is a USAID-funded project led by JHU · CCP that focuses on increasing access to, and use of insecticide treated mosquito nets among populations at risk for malaria. CCPN in collaboration with Networks used the results of the formative research to design, plan, implement and supervise BCC interventions in support of net care and repair in Kokona LGA.

Home Fortification- A Campaign on Use of Micro Nutrient Powders (MNPs)

The Global Alliance for Improved Nutrition (GAIN) supports the development and implementation of home fortification products using micronutrient powders in Nigeria. CCPN is supporting GAIN and its partners in conducting formative research and implementing a BCC campaign to increase demand of MNPs among mothers and caretakers of children aged 6–59 months in Benue State.

Partnership for Reviving Routine Immunisation in Northern Nigeria

In a unique partnership with JHU · CCP responsible for providing technical expertise in social and behavior change communication to increase demand for maternal, newborn and child health services, CCPN supports the national communication advisor who is responsible for coordinating all demand related activities in the states. With cutting edge innovation, support is provided for development of materials and approaches using print, electronic and indigenous media.

WHO Rapid Access Expansion 2015 (RAcE 2015)

In a partnership led by Malaria Consortium, CCPN will support RAcE to catalyze the roll out of integrated Community Case Management (iCCM) in Niger State. CCPN will support strengthening links between the iCCM services and communities by supporting the SMoH to develop and implement a communication strategy including the design and pretest BCC materials and innovative community based interventions.

Partners for Peace (P4P)

A project of the Foundation for Peace in the Niger Delta, CCPN supported P4P to develop a coherent communications strategy, as a guide for the catalysis of a grassroots movement for the audience and project to identify concrete ways to become a part of an inspiring meaningful movement through the "Peace Yes" campaigns.

The Health Communication Capacity Collaborative (HC3) is a five-year USAID funded project and CCPN is responsible for the implementation of state level communication activities and discrete national level efforts. By supporting the state ACSM committees in Kebbi, Akwa Ibom, Nasarawa, Benue and Zamfara states to build capacity and drive malaria communication interventions, HC3 hopes to contribute to facilitation of positive community action against malaria.

United Against Malaria (UAM)

United Against Malaria (UAM) is a global alliance of football (soccer) teams and heroes, celebrities, health and advocacy organizations, governments and corporations who have come together against malaria. SuNMaP is working in conjunction with the National Malaria Control Program and the Nigeria Football Federation. CCPN, a local implementation partner on SuNMaP supports this laudable effort providing strategic communication expertise from concept development.

Community-based Management of Acute Malnutrition (CMAM)

Action Against Hunger works in collaboration with partners in nine northern states of Nigeria expanding coverage of CMAM services in treating acute malnutrition among children under 5 years. CCPN is supporting Action Against Hunger to conduct a pilot project aimed at increasing demand through a planned communication intervention to improve the utilization of CMAM services in selected LGAs of Sokoto state.

Ku Saurara' (Listen Up!)

Ku Sauraral (KS) was designed to improve the health outcomes of adolescents. The project has been active in northern Nigeria since 2000. Collaborating with project partners and staff, CCPN has integrated KS youth methodologies and approaches into its work. The KS material library is housed and sustained by CCPN.'
