= El árabe =

Mexican telenovela

- Genre: Telenovela
- Created by: E.M. Hull; Carlos Olmos
- Directed by: Julio Castillo
- Starring: Enrique Lizalde; Julieta Egurrola
- Country of origin: Mexico
- Original language: Spanish
- No. of episodes: 20

Production
- Executive producer: Irene Sabido
- Cinematography: Carlos S. Zúñiga
- Running time: 30 minutes

Original release
- Network: Canal de las Estrellas
- Release: 1980 – 1980

El árabe (English title: The Arab) is a Mexican telenovela produced by Valentín Pimstein for Televisa in 1980.

== Cast ==
- Enrique Lizalde as Ahmed
- Julieta Egurrola as Diana
- Norma Lazareno as Zarda
- Claudio Brook as Lord Saville
- José Alonso as Ernesto Illinworth
- Wally Barrón as Ibrahim Omar
- Oscar Servín as Gastón
- Chela Nájera
- Guillermo Aguilar
- Dina de Marco
- Santanón
- Eduardo Borja
