= Johns Hopkins University Center for Communication Programs =

Johns Hopkins Center for Communication Programs
- Motto: Inspiring Healthy Behaviors Worldwide
- Established: 1988
- Focus: International and domestic aid
- Location: Baltimore, Maryland, United States
- Website: http://ccp.jhu.edu/

The Johns Hopkins Center for Communication Programs (CCP) was founded over 30 years ago by Phyllis Tilson Piotrow as a part the Johns Hopkins Bloomberg School of Public Health's department of Health, Behavior, and Society and is located in Baltimore, Maryland, United States.

CCP's goal is to advance the science of communication in order to improve health outcomes and save lives through programs such as knowledge management, social and behavior change communication, training and capacity building, strategic advocacy, Entertainment-Education and research and evaluation. The Center for Communication Programs works in over 60 countries, like Angola, Bangladesh, Botswana, Côte d'Ivoire, Nigeria (Centre for Communication Programs Nigeria), and Ethiopia. CCP aims to improve a span of health issues such as HIV/AIDS, malaria, reproductive health, family planning, water and sanitation, tobacco control, nutrition, avian and pandemic influenza, maternal and child health, and gender. CCP partners with many programs both domestically and abroad that seek to advance the health status of nations suffering from these health conditions and more.

== Global health programs ==
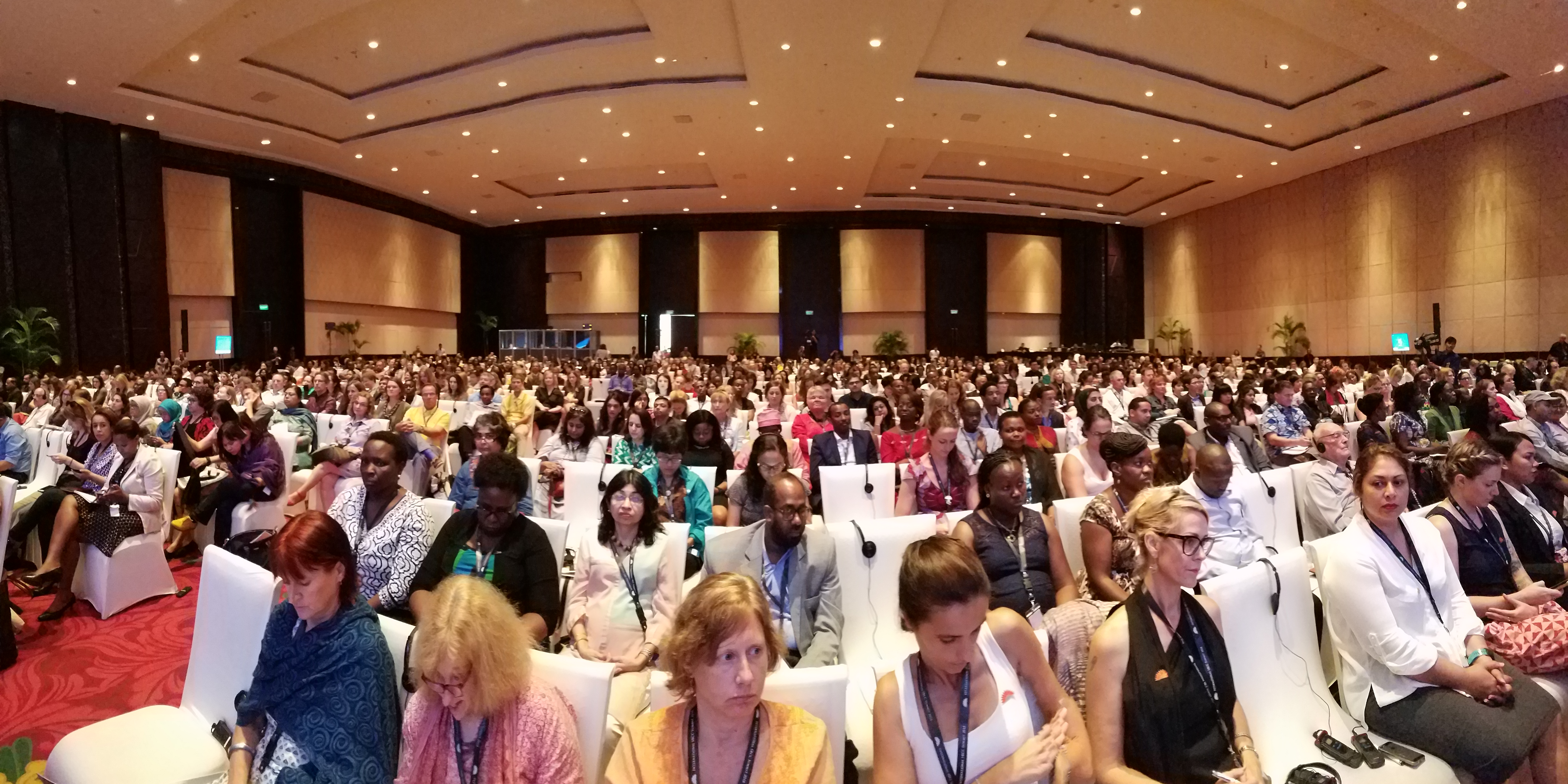
The SBCC Summit 2018 in Bali, Indonesia. Co-organized by CCP, it brought together 1,200+ SBCC professionals from 95 countries.

The Johns Hopkins Center for Communication Programs is involved with work across the globe, specifically focusing on developing countries in Sub-Saharan Africa and Asia. The range of global health programs that CCP offers can be seen on their program website and individual projects can be viewed on their project website.

=== Reproductive health and family planning ===
CCP was founded with reproductive health and family planning at the heart of its initial programming. There was an urgent need for increased communication and behavior change to help support existing health programs, the first of which was USAID's Population Communication Services Project. Other additional early services offered by the CCP included the improvement of family planning through accreditation of public and private health facilities in low-income countries. The family planning and reproductive health (FP/RH) element of CCP is the keystone program which CCP's other programmers were founded on. CCP has partnered with many projects, some of which are listed below (for a full list, see CCP's website).

B’more for Healthy Babies

Baltimore's babies have high rates of being born preterm and underweight, which are high factors that lead to mortality. Additionally, babies in Baltimore die at a rate that is one of the worst in America. Founded by the Baltimore City Health Department, this program has partnered with CCP in order to improve communication so Baltimore can exhibit safer parenting, healthy pregnancies, and a healthier city.

Nigerian Urban Reproductive Health Initiative (NURHI)

NURHI was funded by the Bill and Melinda Gates Foundation and partnered with CCP in hopes of bringing together the private and public sectors of Nigeria to reduce the barriers to family planning services in the area. It looks to focus on six urban regions in order to improve access to maternal health, HIV/AIDS treatment, and post-partum care programs.

Pakistan Initiative for Mothers and Newborns (PAIMAN)

PAIMAN is a USAID funded project that was implemented in order to reduce Pakistan's maternal and neonatal mortality while also improving child health at the household level. CCP served as the lead strategic communication partner and helped the program develop a community-based approach that would allow the program to communicate the benefits of prenatal and postnatal care to mothers across Pakistan.

=== HIV/AIDS ===
The Johns Hopkins Center for Communication Programs partners with domestic and international groups to design, implement, and evaluate HIV/AIDS prevention programs in developing countries. The main goal of these programs is to "address 1) key drivers to primary prevention behaviors, 2) underlying societal factors, and 3) support to biomedical prevention methods." CCP is partnered with many projects, the whole list is available at CCP's HIV/AIDS website.

Community HIV/AIDS Mobilization Program (CHAMP)

CHAMP was implemented by the President's Emergency Plan for AIDS Relief (PEPFAR) in 2005 to reduce the prevalence of HIV/AIDS in Rwanda, partnering with many local organizations in the area. CCP took the lead role in design, management, and communication strategies to help mobilize communities towards HIV prevention and assist the dissemination of messages across the nation.

Malawi BRIDGE II Project

After the success of the Malawi BRIDGE Project, USAID renewed the program for another five years. The goal of the original project was to change the way people in Malawi think and speak about HIV/AIDS, but Malawi BRIDGE II aims to reduce the prevalence of HIV/AIDS of men and women in the area through proactive counseling and individual understanding of their own risk.

Strengthening the AIDS Response, Zambia (STARZ)

STARZ was a program funded by DFID that took place in Zambia between 2004 and 2009. It worked closely with the National AIDS Council and CCP to help collect and disseminate strategic information and create a national monitoring and evaluation system to help track the progress of HIV/AIDS prevention. A National HIV and AIDS Communication Strategy was implemented in 2005, aiding the organization's progress in Zambia.

=== Malaria ===
CCP's global program on malaria works with ongoing international programs to promote behavior change communication, advocacy, health marketing, usage of insecticide-treated mosquito nets, and antimalarial medication. With two years of experience in the field of malaria control, CCP seeks to eliminate the disease on regional levels across the globe. CCP works with a variety of programs to achieve this goal, and a full list of these projects can be viewed at CCP's Malaria website.

Communication and Malaria Initiative in Tanzania (COMMIT)

COMMIT serves as Tanzania's flagship program for behavior change communication and malaria. Funded by USAID and the President's Malaria Initiative (PMI), this program partnered with CCP with the hopes of influencing positive behavior change among target audiences, improving the flow of information, and increasing the effectiveness of local advocacy to prevent malaria transmission.

NetWorks

NetWorks is an ongoing project in many countries, including Senegal, Nigeria, and Uganda, that has partnered with CCP and the Malaria Consortium to eliminate the disease across Africa. The project promotes the usage of long-lasting insecticide treated mosquito nets and reinforces this through behavior change communication campaigns such as the "trois toutes" for malaria prevention and radio spot broadcasting in Senegal. The program aims for universal coverage of mosquito nets across the countries it works in by 2015.

Voices III - Malaria Powerbrokers

Voices III is the third phase of the Voices campaign that was started in 2006. Working in countries such as Mali, Ghana, South Africa, and Uganda, this project seeks to mobilize political and cultural support for malaria control through the help of CCP and various communication strategies. Funded by the Bill and Melinda Gates Foundation, the project has spurred the creation of the United Against Malaria campaign, which looks to achieve universal access to mosquito nets and malaria medicine in Africa by 2015.

== See also ==
- Behavior change (public health)
- Social and Behavior Change Communication
- Entertainment-Education
