= Ven conmigo (TV series) =

- Genre: Telenovela
- Created by: Célia Alcántara; Guillermina Rivas; Miguel Sabido
- Directed by: Luis Vega
- Starring: Silvia Derbez; Jaime Fernández
- Country of origin: Mexico
- Original language: Spanish

Production
- Executive producer: Irene Sabido
- Cinematography: Miguel Sabido

Original release
- Network: Canal 2
- Release: 1975

Ven conmigo (English: Come with Me) is a Mexican telenovela produced by Irene Sabido for Televisa in 1975.

== Cast ==
- Silvia Derbez as Caridad Escobar
- Jaime Fernández as Arturo Fernandez del Valle
- Aaron Hérnan as Carlos
- Alma Muriel as Barbara
- Juan Ferrara as Guillermo
- July Furlong as Vicky
- Rosario Gálvez as Laura
- Amparo Arozamena as Eulogia
- María Rojo as Angelica Gutierrez
- Jaime Moreno as Antonio
- Juan Pelaez as Jorge
- Pedro Armendáriz Jr as Eduardo

== Relevance ==
The show promoted adult "literacy"; enrollment in such classes jumped ninefold.
