= Irene Sabido =

Mexican producer and writer

- Born: Mexico City, Mexico
- Occupations: Producer and writer
- Years active: 1975–1997

Irene Sabido (born in Mexico City, Mexico) is a Mexican producer and writer, known for Ven conmigo (1975), El árabe (1980), and Los hijos de nadie (1997).

== Filmography ==
=== Television ===
Television
Year	Title	Role	Notes
2007	Historias engarzadas	Herself	TV series documentary

=== Works ===
Telenovelas produced
Year	Title	Notes
1975	Ven conmigo	Producer and writer
1978	Santa	Executive producer
1978	Rosario de amor	Executive producer
1978	Ardiente secreto	Executive producer
1978	Acompáñame	Executive producer
1979	Lágrimas de Amor	Executive producer
1979	Julia	Executive producer
1979	Elisa	Executive producer
1979	El amor llegó más tarde	Executive producer
1979	Añoranza	Executive producer
1980	Corazones sin rumbo	Executive producer
1980	El combate	Executive producer
1980	El árabe	Executive producer
1980	Caminemos	Executive producer
1981	Nosotras las mujeres	Executive producer
1982	Por amor	Executive producer
1983	El amor ajeno	Executive producer
1987	Yesenia	Executive producer
1993	Videoteatros: Véngan corriendo que les tengo un muerto	Executive producer
1997	Los hijos de nadie	Executive producer
