= Acompáñame (TV series) =

- Genre: Telenovela
- Written by: Carlos Olmos; Miguel Sabido
- Directed by: Miguel Sabido; Luis Vega
- Starring: Silvia Derbez; Kitty de Hoyos; Magda Guzmán
- Opening theme: "Acompáñame" by Felipe Gil
- Country of origin: Mexico
- Original language: Spanish

Production
- Executive producer: Irene Sabido

Original release
- Network: Canal de las Estrellas
- Release: 1977 – 1977

Acompáñame, is a Mexican telenovela produced by Irene Sabido for Televisa in 1977. The show stars Silvia Derbez, Kitty de Hoyos, and Magda Guzmán.

== Cast ==
- Silvia Derbez as Amanda
- Kitty de Hoyos as Raquel
- Magda Guzmán as Esperanza
- Marta Aura as Angustias
- Fernando Larrañaga as Esteban
- Carlos Monden as Octavio
- Raúl "Chato" Padilla as Efrén
- Martha Zavaleta as Yolanda
- Elizabeth Dupeyrón as Rita
- María Rojo as Martha
- Jorge Ortiz de Pinedo as Federico
- Tony Carbajal as Dr. Beltrán
- Octavio Galindo as Alberto
- Maya Ramos as María Luisa
- Silvia Mariscal as Adriana
- Ramón Arauza as Fabián
- Lili Inclán as Flavia
- Zully Keith as Mercedes
- Laura Zapata as Karla
- Guillermo Gil as Jesús
- Lourdes Canale as Estela
- Jorge Lavat as Doctor
- Dolores Beristáin as Vecina
- Blanca Torres as Trabajadora social
- Eduardo Rojas as Cacomixtle
