= Sonny Fox =

American game show host and television personality (1925–2021)

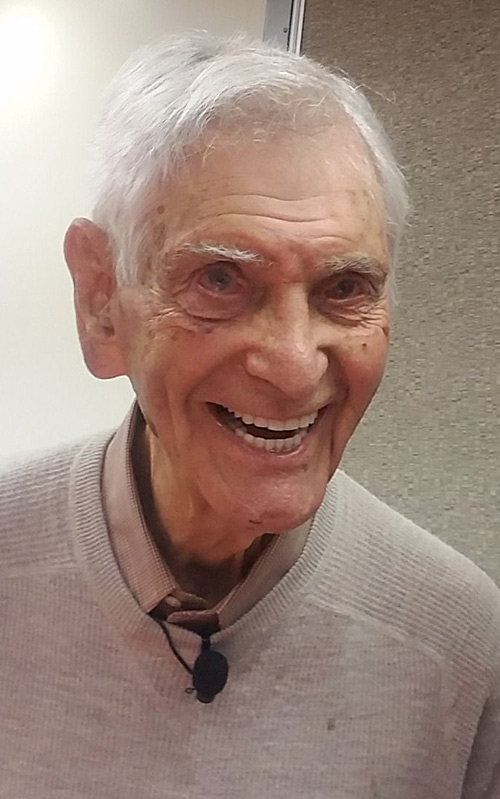
- Sonny Fox in 2018
- Born: Irwin Fox; June 17, 1925; Brooklyn, New York, U.S.
- Died: January 24, 2021 (aged 95); Encino, California, U.S.
- Occupations: Television host, executive and broadcasting consultant
- Years active: 1947–2015
- Known for: Host of Wonderama
- Website: www.sonnyfox.tv

Irwin "Sonny" Fox (June 17, 1925 – January 24, 2021) was an American television host and broadcaster who was the host of the children's television program, Wonderama. Through his career, he had hosted other children's educational and entertainment shows including Let's Take a Trip, Just for Fun and On Your Mark, in addition to family shows including The $64,000 show. Fox was also a producer of movies including And Baby Makes Six, Mysterious Two and Brontë. He served as the chairman of Populations Communication International, a non profit advocating for a change in attitudes toward family planning.

== Early life ==
Irwin Fox was born on June 17, 1925, to a Jewish family in the Parkville section of Brooklyn, New York, to parents Gertrude (Goldberg) and Julius A. Fox. His father was in the textile business and his mother was a theater ticket broker. He attended James Madison High School in the Midwood section of Brooklyn, New York. He joined the army in 1943 and served in World War II in England and France. He was taken a prisoner of war by the German forces in the Battle of the Bulge. His life was saved by Master Sergeant Roddie Edmonds saying, "We are all Jews here" when the Nazi officers demanded that all Jewish prisoners of war be pointed out. In a separate event, an American clerk at the camp marked him as a Protestant rather than Jewish, when Jewish prisoners were identified and sent to a slave labor camp in Berga, in Germany.

He returned to the United States after the war and graduated with a bachelor's degree in television and radio production from New York University in 1947.

== Career ==
=== Early years ===
Fox started his career as a producer for The Candid Microphone with Allen Funt, a radio show that would later become Candid Camera. He later worked for Voice of America for three years as a reporter and later as a war correspondent during the Korean War.

Fox's first experience in children's programming came in 1954, with a St. Louis program, The Finder on KETC-TV, a children's news and travelogue program where he would find interesting things for children to learn from. His first national exposure came when CBS brought him aboard in 1955. For three years he co-hosted the children's travelogue, Let's Take a Trip. In an interview for PBS's The American Experience he described the show as "Taking two children on sort of an electronic field trip every week – live, remote location, no audience, no sponsors".

=== The $64,000 Challenge ===
In 1956, Fox became the first host of the game show The $64,000 Challenge, a spinoff of The $64,000 Question. In his first appearance he was identified as "Bill Fox," but by the second program he became "Sonny Fox" because, he claimed, the name "Bill Fox" had been registered by another entertainment personality; in the same interview Fox stated his difficulties as a game show host included his "predilection for asking the answers." Fox was replaced a few weeks into the series by Ralph Story.

Fox's brief tenure on the show may have enabled him to escape tainting from the 1950s quiz show scandals, and during an interview on American Experience he reported being horrified by related testimony to Congress—including that of child star Patty Duke, who had participated on The $64,000 Challenge and who later admitted that she had been coached to lie to Congressional investigators. Fox's later involvement in game show hosting was limited to occasional substitutions for Bill Cullen (the original host of The Price Is Right) and Bud Collyer (host of Beat the Clock and To Tell the Truth), though he did later host the first season of The Movie Game in 1969–70.

=== Wonderama ===
In 1959, the independent television station group Metromedia (born from the former DuMont Network) hired Fox to host Wonderama on its New York flagship station, WABD (later becoming WNEW-TV), succeeding the team of Bill Britten and Doris Faye. Fox became Wonderama's sole host until 1967. Fox's version of the program was a mixture of slapstick and serious content, with the marathon Wonderama (during Fox's tenure the show ran four hours Sunday mornings) including Shakespearean dramatizations, guest celebrities including John Lindsay and Robert Kennedy, magic demonstrations (customarily by magician James "The Amazing" Randi), art instruction, spelling bees, Simon Says, learning games, or other elements. He forfeited another opportunity to host a talk show, The New Yorkers, because it would mean leaving Wonderama.

=== Just for Fun! ===
In 1959 Fox created and hosted the Saturday morning children's television show Just For Fun! which, like Wonderama, aired on WNEW-TV in New York. Based upon the "color war" team competitions common at children's summer camp, participants engaged in a wide range of contests. Guests on the program included Yogi Berra, Tim Conway, Huntz Hall, Charlotte Rae, and Soupy Sales. Fox left the program in 1965.

=== On Your Mark ===
In 1960, Fox hosted ABC's first original Saturday morning show, On Your Mark, a game show in which children answered questions about various professions. Because Fox was under "exclusive" contract to WNEW-TV, On Your Mark aired on Channel 5 in New York, instead of ABC's station WABC-TV. On Your Mark lasted one season.

=== Other media activities ===
In 1966, Fox appeared in the film The Christmas That Almost Wasn't. Fox co-hosted a daily talk/variety show for adults titled The New Yorkers on WNEW-TV, with co-hosts Penelope Wilson and Gloria Okon, plus newsman Stewart Klein in 1967. In 1976, Fox hosted the California-based Way Out Games, and during 1977 he ran children's programming for NBC. During the 1970s Fox served as a lecturer at the State University of New York at Stony Brook.

In the later part of his career, he also served as a producer of made for TV movies And Baby Makes Six (1979), Mysterious Two (1982) and Brontë (1983).

In the mid-1980s, Fox joined and later became the chairman of the board for Population Communications International (PCI), a New York-based nonprofit dedicated to improving family planning issues through popular media. PCI's work included working with U.S. and international soap opera producers, helping them develop "more healthful" family planning story lines.

In September 2012, Fox published his memoirs, titled But You Made the Front Page! Wonderama, Wars and a Whole Bunch of Life.

== Personal life and death ==
He married his wife Gloria (née Benson) Fox and had three sons and one daughter. The marriage ended in a divorce.

Fox died from COVID-19 in Encino, California, on January 24, 2021. He was 95 years old.

== See also ==
- Entertainment-Education
- David Poindexter
- Miguel Sabido
