= D. Lawrence Kincaid =

American academic (born 1945)

Academic background
- Education: B.A., Psychology; M.A., Communication; Ph.D., Communication
- Alma mater: University of Kansas; Michigan State University
- Thesis: Communication Networks, Locus of Control, and Family Planning Among Migrants to the Periphery of Mexico City

Academic work
- Institutions: Johns Hopkins University; East-West Center; State University of New York at Albany
- Notable works: Communication Networks: Toward a New Paradigm for Research; Communication Theory: Eastern and Western Perspectives

D. Lawrence Kincaid (born 1945) is an American communication researcher who originated the convergence theory of communication. He was a senior advisor for the Research and Evaluation Division of the Center for Communication Programs and an associate scientist in the Faculty of Social and Behavioral Sciences at the Johns Hopkins Bloomberg School of Public Health.

== Education and career ==
Kincaid received his B.A. (1967) in psychology from the University of Kansas. In 1967–1969, he was a Peace Corps volunteer in Colombia and facilitated community development and cooperative organization. He earned his M.A. (1971) and Ph.D. (1972) in communication from Michigan State University. In 1973, he joined the East-West Communication Institute at the East-West Center in Honolulu, Hawaii, and worked as a research associate under the directorship of Wilbur Schramm. He was also an associate professor in the Department of Communication at the State University of New York at Albany.

In the Johns Hopkins Bloomberg School of Public Health, Kincaid was the founding director of the Research and Evaluation Division of the Center for Communication Programs from 1988 to 1997. He was also instrumental in establishing the Interdepartmental Health Communication Program and served as the first director. He has been involved in health communication programs in Asia, Latin America, and Africa for 30 years.

== Contributions ==
Kincaid is best known for his convergence model of communication, a nonlinear model of communication wherein two communicators strive to reach "mutual understanding." He proposed the model in his 1979 East-West Communication Institute Monograph (Paper No. 18) and detailed it in his book, Communication Networks: Toward a New Paradigm for Research (Free Press, 1981) with Everett Rogers. He applied cybernetics and information theory to the process of meaning coordination and human understanding. In recent years, this model has been particularly popular among proponents of development communication.

Kincaid identified seven epistemological biases that had characterized the dominant Western models of communication: (1) a view of communication as linear rather than cyclical; (2) a message-source bias rather than a focus on relatedness and interdependence; (3) an analysis of objects of communication in a manner that isolates them from larger contexts; (4) a concentration on discrete messages instead of silence, rhythm, and timing; (5) a concentration on persuasion rather than understanding, agreement, and collective action; (6) attention to individuals rather than relationships; (7) a model of one-way mechanistic causation rather than mutual causation.

Kincaid also developed new methods for multivariate causal attribution analysis of communication impact, the communication for participatory development model, the ideational model for behavior change communication and evaluation, computer programs to analyze the multi-dimensional image of audience perceptions, computer simulation of social networks for the theory of bounded normative influence, and drama theory to measure the impact of entertainment-education programs.

Kincaid is a co-author of Health Communication: Lessons from Family Planning and Reproductive Health, considered by many as a seminal book on the topic of health communication.

== Awards ==
- He edited Communication Theory: Eastern and Western Perspectives, which won the 1988 Outstanding Book Award from the Intercultural and Development Communication Division of the International Communication Association.
- ICA Award for Applied Research, 2015

== Publications ==
- Kincaid, D. L. (1979). The convergence model of communication (East-West Communication Institute Paper No. 18). Honolulu, HI: East-West Center.
- Kincaid, D. L. (1985). Recent developments in the methods for communication research. Journal of East and West Studies, 14(1), 89–98.
- Kincaid, D. L. (1987). The convergence theory of communication, self-organization, and cultural evolution. In D. L. Kincaid (Ed.), Communication theory: Eastern and Western perspectives (pp. 209–221). San Diego, CA: Academic Press.
- Kincaid, D. L. (1988). The convergence theory of intercultural communication. In Y. Y. Kim & W. B. Gudykunst (Eds.), Theories in intercultural communication (pp. 280–298). Newbury Park, CA: Sage.
- Kincaid, D. L. (1993). Communication network dynamics, cohesion, centrality and cultural evolution. In W. B. Richards & G. A. Barnett (Eds.), Progress in communication sciences (Vol. 12, pp. 111–133). Norwood, NJ: Ablex.
- Kincaid, D. L. (2000). Mass media, ideation, and behavior: A longitudinal analysis of contraceptive change in the Philippines. Communication Research, 27(6), 723–63.
- Kincaid, D. L. (2002). Drama, emotion and cultural convergence. Communication Theory, 12(2), 136–52.
- Kincaid, D. L., Yum, J. O., Woelfel, J., & Barnett, G. A. (1983). The cultural convergence of Korean immigrants in Hawaii: An empirical test of a mathematical theory. Quality and Quantity, 18(1), 59–78.
- Barnett. G. A., & Kincaid, D. L. (1983). Cultural convergence: A mathematical theory. In W. B. Gudykunst (Ed.), Intercultural communication theory: Current perspectives (pp. 171–194). Beverly Hills, CA: Sage.
- Rogers, E. M., & Kincaid, D. L. (1981). Communication network: Toward a new paradigm for research. New York, NY: Free Press.

== See also ==
- Communication sciences
- Communication studies
- Communication theory
- Cybernetics
- Development communication
- Everett M. Rogers
- Health Communication
- Information Theory
- Wilbur Schramm
