= Caminemos =

Mexican telenovela

- Genre: Telenovela
- Directed by: Julio Castillo
- Starring: Irma Lozano; Enrique Lizalde
- Country of origin: Mexico
- Original language: Spanish
- No. of episodes: 20

Production
- Executive producer: Irene Sabido
- Running time: 30 minutes

Original release
- Network: Canal de las Estrellas
- Release: 1980

Caminemos (English title: Let's walk) is a Mexican telenovela produced by Irene Sabido for Televisa in 1980.

== Cast ==
- Irma Lozano as Eudelia/Evelia
- Enrique Lizalde as Ricardo
- Marga López as Aurora
- Norma Lazareno as Adelina
- Jaime Garza as Julio
- Ana Silvia Garza as Gloria
- Carmen Delgado as Pily
- Lorena Rivero as Elsa
- Alejandro Guce as Arturo
- Andres Ruiz Sandoval as Uriel
- Natasha Pueblita as Miriam (daughter)
- Adriana Roel as Miriam
- Sonia Martinez as Tere
- Margot Wagner as Martha
- Hector Cruz as Victor
- Alvaro Zermeño as Ernesto
