= Social and behavior change communication =

Interactive process to develop communication strategies

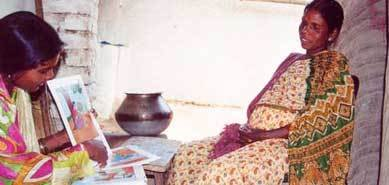
SBCC by health practitioner

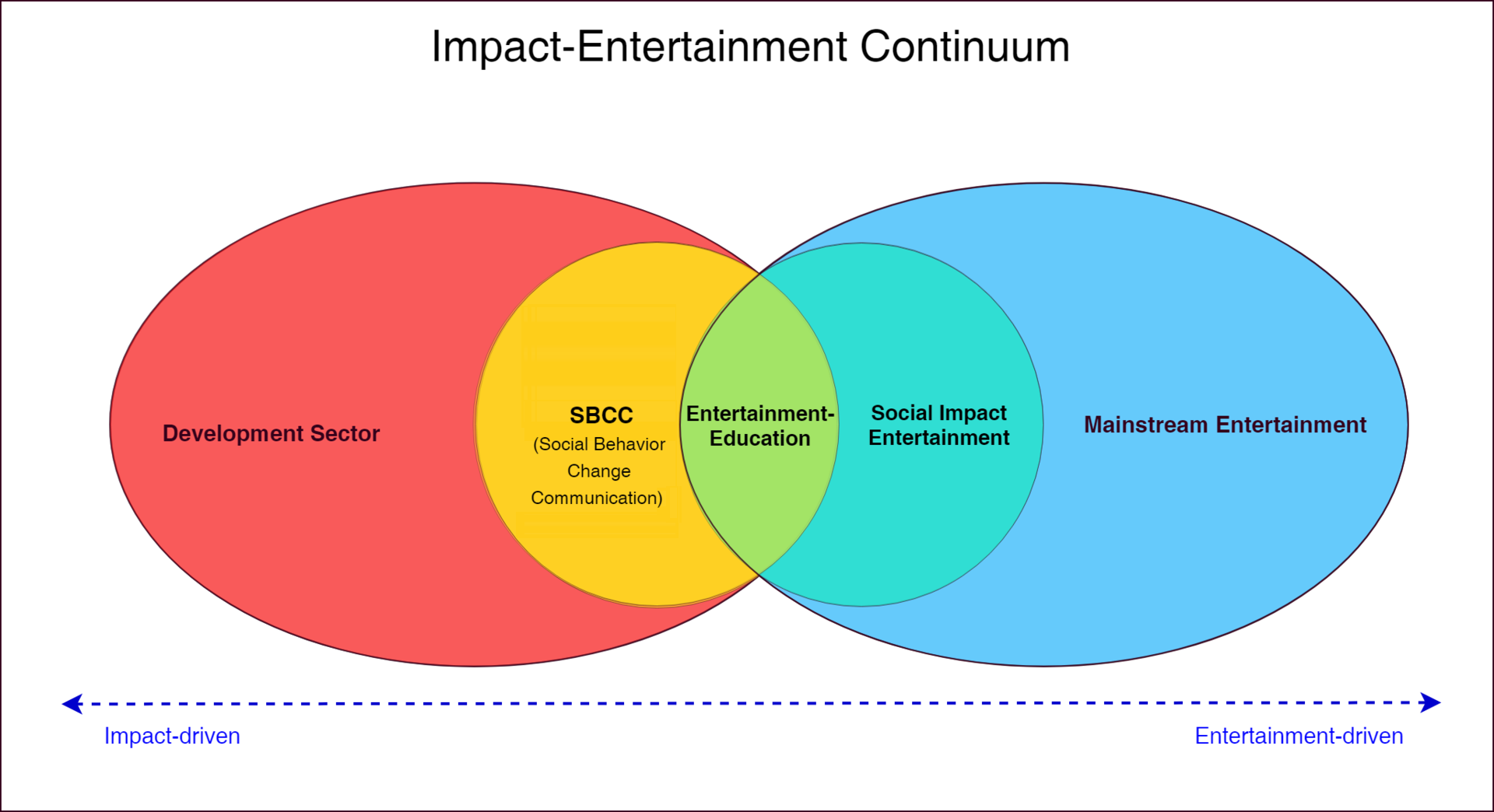
SBCC on the Development-Entertainment spectrum.

Social and behavior change communication (SBCC), often also only "BCC" or "Communication for Development (C4D)" is an interactive process of any intervention with individuals, group or community (as integrated with an overall program) to develop communication strategies to promote positive behaviors which are appropriate to their settings and thereby solving the world's most pressing health problems. This in turn provides a supportive environment which will enable people to initiate, sustain and maintain positive and desirable behavior outcomes.

SBCC is the strategic use of communication to promote positive health outcomes, based on proven theories and models of behavior change. SBCC employs a systematic process beginning with formative research and behavior analysis, followed by communication planning, implementation, and monitoring and evaluation. Audiences are carefully segmented, messages and materials are pre-tested, and mass media (which include radio, television, billboards, print material, internet), interpersonal channels (such as client-provider interaction, group presentations) and community mobilisation are used to achieve defined behavioral objectives.

BCC should not be confused with behavior modification, a term with specific meaning in a clinical psychiatry setting. SBCC differentiates itself from social impact entertainment primarily through its "impact first", rather than "story first", approach.

== Background ==
Providing people with information and teaching them how they should behave does not lead to desirable change in their response/behavior. However, when there is a supportive environment with information and communication (teaching) then there is a desirable change in the behavior of the target group. Thus, SBCC is proved to be an instructional intervention which has a close interface with education and communication. It is a strategic and group oriented form of communication to perceive a desired change in behavior of target group.

However, it is not as easy as it sounds, as there is no one-size-fits all strategy for any intervention. Interventions are context specific. Therefore, there is a need for proper information management and sharing. It is advised to document and report the interventions that worked somewhere, for example, the kind of messages, the medium and the audience.

== Steps ==
SBCC is the comprehensive process in which one passes through the stages:

Unaware > Aware > Concerned > Knowledgeable > Motivated to change > Practicing trial behavior change

> Sustained behavior change

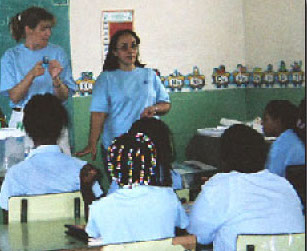
SBCC in classroom practices

It involves the following steps:

1. State program goals
2. Involve stakeholders
3. Identify target populations
4. Conduct formative BCC assessments
5. Segment target populations
6. Define behavior change objectives
7. Define SBCC strategy & monitoring and evaluation plan
8. Develop communication products
9. Pretest
10. Implement and monitor
11. Evaluate
12. Analyze feedback and revise

== Enabling factors ==
Behavior change is influenced by motivation from others (external influence) as well as from within oneself (internal influence). Internal influence plays a significant role in creating more enjoyment of a behavior change, instilling a sense of ownership of the new behavior, which in turn instills a sense of ownership of the changed behavior. When designing SBCC strategies, enabling factors that affect the outcome must be considered. The following are some of the factors:

- Effective communication
- Enabling environment, which include policies, human rights community values and norms
- User-friendly, accessible services and commodities

== Theories ==
SBCC has several levels at which it can be implemented. Each level includes several theories. Each level (and each theory) employs specific communication channels.

Individual level

- Health belief model
- Theory of reasoned action and planned behavior
- Transtheoretical model/Stages of change
- Social learning theory

Community level

- Diffusion of innovations theory
- Community mobilization

Change in organizations

- 4 stage change

Public policy Level

- Distinct stages of initiation, action, implementation, evaluation and re-formulation

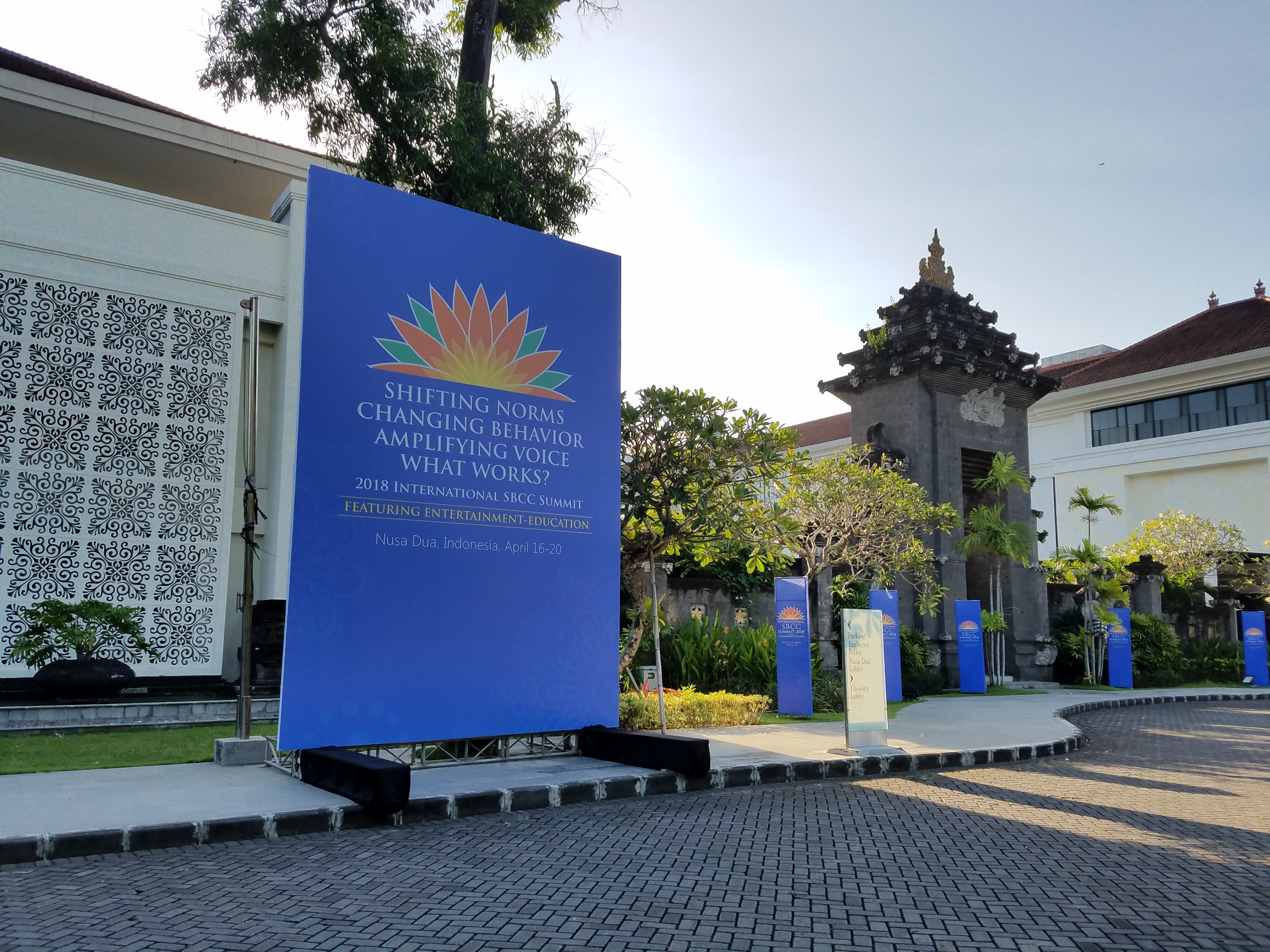
The SBCC Summit 2018 in Bali, Indonesia, focusing on social and behavior change communication and featuring Entertainment-Education.

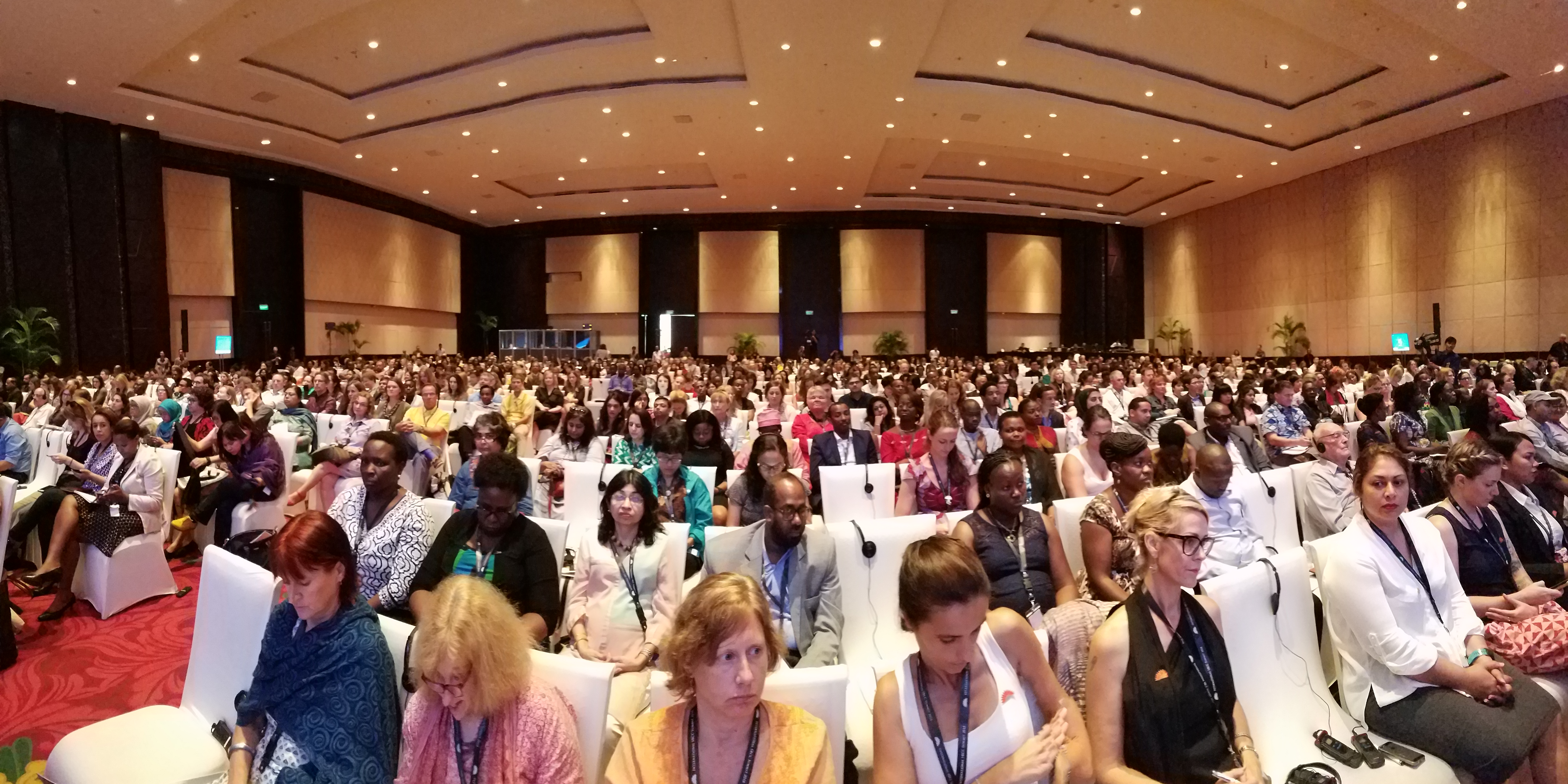
Over 1,200 attendees came to the 2018 SBCC Summit, where Entertainment-Education was a main topic among Social and Behavior Chance Communications professionals.

== Strategies ==
SBCC is different from the ordinary instructional method of communication and is target specific. A society consists of many sub-groups. The strategy for SBCC will vary from group to group. The following points are important while considering the SBCC strategy.

- Vulnerability/risk factor of the target group
- The vulnerability/risk factor of the group which is to be addressed
- The conflict and obstacles in the way to desired change in behavior
- Type of message and communication media which can best be used to reach the target group
- Type of resources available and assessment of existing knowledge of the target group about the issue which is going to be dealt with

There can be several more points in this list. A successful SBCC requires much research and meticulous planning about the knowledge content of the subject and behavior/attitude pattern of the target group.

Social marketing has been described as a tool for sustainable behaviour change.

== Implications ==
SBCC has proven effective in several health areas, such as increasing the use of family planning methods, reducing the spread of malaria and other infectious diseases, and improving newborn and maternal health.

SBCC is an effective tool for dealing with many community and group related problems. BCC has been adapted as an effective strategy for community mobilization, health and environmental education and various public outreach programs. Enhanced knowledge about the behavior change process has facilitated the design of communications programs to reduce the risk of HIV transmission and AIDS. A wide variety of health promotion strategies use communication as either an educational or norm-forming strategy. In addition, specific strategies must be designed for high-risk groups such as women, young people, injecting drug abusers, homosexuals and HIV positive groups.

== Role in HIV/AIDS ==
SBCC consists of effective communication which is central to the success of interventions to reduce the risk of HIV infection. It plays a role to:

- Increase knowledge
- Stimulate community dialogue
- Promote essential attitude change
- Advocate for policy changes
- Create a demand for information and services
- Reduce stigma and discrimination
- Promote services for prevention and care

== See also ==
- Attitude change
- Behavior change method
- Behavior change (public health)
- Design for behaviour change
- Entertainment-Education
- Johns Hopkins University Center for Communication Programs
- Lifestyle medicine
