= Sleeper effect =

Psychological phenomenon

Figure A: Normal Decay Figure B: Sleeper Effect

The sleeper effect is a psychological phenomenon that relates to persuasion. It is a delayed increase in the effect of a message that is accompanied by a discounting cue, typically being some negative connotation or lack of credibility in the message, while a positive message may evoke an immediate positive response which decays over time. The sleeper effect also refers to a delayed positive response that is maintained over time. The effect was first noticed among US Army soldiers exposed to army propaganda. It was hypothesized that over time the soldiers forgot that the message was propaganda. The effect has been widely studied but notoriously difficult to reproduce, leading to some doubt over its existence.

== The sleeper effect ==
When people are exposed normally to a persuasive message (such as an engaging or persuasive television advertisement), their attitudes toward the advocacy of the message display a significant increase.

Over time, however, their newly formed attitudes seem to gravitate back toward the opinion held prior to receiving the message, almost as if they were never exposed to the communication. This pattern of normal decay in attitudes has been documented as the most frequently observed longitudinal pattern of persuasion research (Eagly & Chaiken, 1993).

In contrast, some messages are often accompanied with a discounting cue (e.g., a message disclaimer, a low-credibility source) that would arouse a recipient's suspicion of the validity of the message and suppress any attitude change that might occur by exposure to the message alone. Furthermore, when people are exposed to a persuasive message followed by a discounting cue, people tend to be more persuaded over time; this is referred to as the sleeper effect (Hovland & Weiss, 1951; Cook & Flay, 1978).

For example, in political campaigns during important elections, undecided voters often see negative advertisements about a party or candidate for office. At the end of the advertisement, they also might notice that the opposing candidate paid for the advertisement. Presumably, this would make voters question the truthfulness of the advertisement, and consequently, they may not be persuaded initially. However, even though the source of the advertisement lacked credibility, voters will be more likely to be persuaded later (and ultimately, vote against the candidate disfavored by the advertisement).

This pattern of attitude change has puzzled social psychologists for nearly half a century, primarily due to its counter-intuitive nature and for its potential to aid in understanding attitude processes (Eagly & Chaiken, 1993). It has been a very widely studied phenomenon of persuasion research (Kumkale & Albarracín, 2004; see also Cook & Flay, 1978). Despite a long history, the sleeper effect has been notoriously difficult to obtain or to replicate, with the exception of a pair of studies by Gruder et al. (1978).

== Controversy about the existence of a "sleeper effect" ==
One of the more challenging aspects that the sleeper effect posed to some researchers in early studies was the sheer difficulty of obtaining the effect.

The sleeper effect is controversial because the influence of persuasive communication is greater when one measures the effect closer to the presentation instead of farther from the time of the reception.

After attempting to replicate the effect and failing, some researchers suggested that it might be better to accept the null hypothesis and conclude that the sleeper effect does not exist.

The sleeper effect is involved with initial message impression so the phenomenon has implications for models of persuasion, including teaching methods, as well as more recent conceptualizations, such as the heuristic-systematic model and the elaboration likelihood model.

However, Cook and his associates responded by suggesting that previous studies failed to obtain the sleeper effect because the requirements for a strong test were not met. Specifically, they argued that the sleeper effect will occur only if:

(a) the message is persuasive;
(b) the discounting cue has a strong enough effect to suppress initial attitude change;
(c) enough time has elapsed between immediate and delayed post-tests; and
(d) the message itself still has an effect on attitudes during the delayed post-test.

Experimental studies conducted did, in fact, provide evidence for the sleeper effect occurring under such theoretically relevant conditions. Furthermore, the sleeper effect did not occur when any of the four requirements were not met.

According to the dissociation interpretation, a sleeper effect appears to happen when a convincing message is conferred with a discounting cue (such as a low-credible source or counterargument). A sleeper effect occurs because of an impulsive dissociation of a message and a discounting cue over time (contrasting to a simple forgetting of a source).

== First identified ==
The sleeper effect was first identified in US Army soldiers during World War II, after attempts to change their opinions and morals. Carl Hovland et al. measured the soldier's opinions five days or nine weeks after they were shown a movie presentation of army propaganda. It was found that the difference in opinions of those who had observed the army propaganda movie and those who did not watch the movie were greater nine weeks after viewing it than five days. The difference in delayed persuasion is (which Hovland et al. termed) the sleeper effect, where there was a significant increase of persuasion in the experimental group.

The first efforts to justify the effect were consistent with the understanding of persuasion processes at that time. Hovland and his colleagues introduced a program of research to study how recall of the message and the source persuaded the sleeper effect. They first hypothesized that message receivers forget the noncredible communicator as time goes by, and therefore the initial message rejection diminishes. Nevertheless, they later propositioned that message receivers may not entirely forget the cue, yet the association between the representations of the discounting cue and the message content may fade over time and produce a sleeper effect. These two formulations vary in that (a) forgetting suggests that the traces of the cue disappear or become unavailable in memory over time, while (b) dissociation suggests that cue remains available in memory but is simply less easily retrieved (less accessible) in relation to the topic of communication.

== Hypotheses on how the sleeper effect occurs ==
Because the sleeper effect has been considered to be counter-intuitive, researchers since the early 1950s have attempted to explain how and why it occurs.

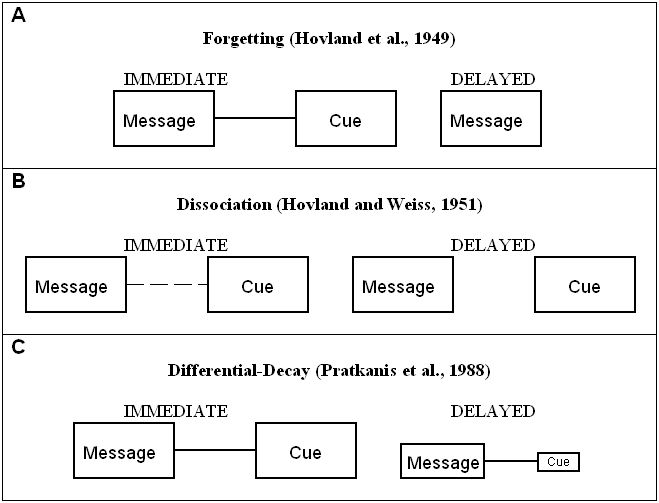
Figure A: Forgetting Figure B: Dissociation Figure C: Differential-Decay

=== Forgetting and dissociation ===
According to the forgetting hypothesis, a discounting cue associated with a message initially decreases acceptance of the message. As time goes by, one may observe a delayed increase of persuasion if the recipient forgets the cue but recalls the merits of the message (Hovland et al., 1949). To test this hypothesis, Hovland and his colleagues (Hovland & Weiss, 1951; Kelman & Hovland, 1953; Weiss, 1953) initiated a series of experiments in which participants received messages attributed to either trustworthy or untrustworthy sources and then completed measures of opinions as well as of recall of the message content and the source. Overall, messages with credible sources produced greater initial persuasion than messages delivered by non credible sources.

Hovland, Lumsdaine, and Sheffield (1949) first discovered the effect by a well-known study that demonstrated the delayed impact of a World War II propaganda movie on American soldiers.

With a subset of conditions that caused participants to question the credibility of the source in the movie, participants later reported a slight increase of persuasion (much to the researchers' surprise). After examining the results, they initially hypothesized that forgetting of the discounting cue (in this case, the non-credible source) was causing the effect. Over time, however, the effect of the messages presented by credible sources decayed, whereas the effect of the messages presented by non-credible sources either remained the same or increased slightly. Despite evidence for the sleeper effect from this series of studies, the recall measures indicated that recipients could still remember the non-credible sources of the messages at the time of the delayed follow-up.

This is when the forgetting hypothesis was replaced by the dissociation hypothesis. Now according to the dissociation hypothesis the sleeper effect does not need to imply that the discounting cue becomes permanently unavailable in memory. A weakened association between the cue and the message may be sufficient for the sleeper effect to occur. As the association weakens over time, rendering the cue less accessible in relation to the communication topic, there may be a delayed increase in persuasion as long as the message arguments are still memorable. To this extent, factors that facilitate retention of the message content should create settings conducive to the sleeper effect.

According to this reasoning, the sleeper effect occurs because the association between the discounting cue and the message in one's memory becomes weakened over time; hence, when the message is recalled for purposes of producing an attitude, the source is not readily associated.

=== Differential decay ===
Something that Hovland and his team ignored that is important is why over time, the discounting cue becomes less accessible than the message even when both pieces are similarly effective at the onset. To answer this question Greenwald, Pratkanis, and their team (Greenwald et al., 1986; Pratkanis et al., 1988) implemented a study to identify the conditions by which the sleeper effect does and does not occur. Pratkanis directed a series of seventeen experiments in which he presented the discounting cue either before or after the message and found that the sleeper effect occurred mostly when the cue followed the message but not when the cue was first. In order to explain his findings, Pratkanis and his team proposed a modified forgetting hypothesis, which suggested that the sleeper effect occurs because the effect of the message and the cues decay at different rates. Based on this suggestion the message and the cue act like two communications operating in opposite directions. The sleeper effect emerges when the effect of these communications is about equal, promptly following message exposure, but the effect of the cue later decays more rapidly than that of the message. However, the timing of the discounting cue is essential to produce the effect because information presented first lasts longer, whereas more recent information dissipates more rapidly (Miller & Campbell, 1959). Thus, the sleeper effect should occur when the discounting cue occurs at the end of a persuasive communication and stimulates a primacy effect of the message content. Years later, Pratkanis, Greenwald, Leippe, and Baumgardner (1988) offered an alternative hypothesis that differed from Hovland and his colleagues.

They argued that the conditions under which the sleeper effect is more likely to occur were not emphasized by the dissociation hypothesis. Additionally, the requirements for a sleeper effect specified by Gruder et al. (1978) did not detail the empirical conditions necessary to observe the sleeper effect.

== See also ==
- Disinformation – Deliberately misleading information
- Elaboration likelihood model – Dual process theory of persuasion
- Framing (social sciences) – Effect of how information is presented on perception
- Heuristic-systematic model of information processing – Dual-process theory of persuasion
- Misinformation – Incorrect or misleading information
- Need for cognition – Psychology concept
- Propaganda – Communication used to influence opinion
- Psychological manipulation – Exploitative type of social influence
- Source amnesia – Remembering information but not its source
- Source misattribution – Misidentification during memory recall
- Source-monitoring error – Type of memory error
