= Elaboration likelihood model =

Dual process theory of persuasion

The elaboration likelihood model (ELM) of persuasion is a dual process theory describing the change of attitudes. The ELM was developed by Richard E. Petty and John Cacioppo in 1986. The model aims to explain different ways of processing stimuli, why they are used, and their outcomes on attitude change. The ELM proposes two major routes to persuasion: the central route and the peripheral route.

== Origin ==
Elaboration likelihood model is a general theory of attitude change. According to the theory's developers Richard E. Petty and John T. Cacioppo, the theory was created to provide a general "framework for organizing, categorizing, and understanding the basic processes underlying the effectiveness of persuasive communications".

The study of attitudes and persuasion began as the central focus of social psychology, featured in the work of psychologists Gordon Allport (1935) and Edward Alsworth Ross (1908). Allport described attitudes as "the most distinctive and indispensable concept in contemporary social psychology". Considerable research was devoted to the study of attitudes and persuasion from the 1930s through the late 1970s. These studies embarked on various relevant issues regarding attitudes and persuasion, such as the consistency between attitudes and behaviors and the processes underlying attitude/behavior correspondence. However, Petty and Cacioppo noticed a major problem facing attitude and persuasion researchers to the effect that there was minimal agreement regarding "if, when, and how the traditional source, message, recipient, and channel variables affected attitude change". Noticing this problem, Petty and Cacioppo developed the elaboration likelihood model as their attempt to account for the differential persistence of communication-induced attitude change. Petty and Cacioppo suggested that different empirical findings and theories on attitude persistence could be viewed as stressing one of two routes to persuasion which they presented in their elaboration likelihood model.

== Core ideas ==
There are four core ideas to the ELM.

1. The ELM argues that when a person encounters some form of communication, they can process this communication with varying levels of thought (elaboration), ranging from a low degree of thought (low elaboration) to a high degree of thought (high elaboration). Factors that contribute to elaboration include different motivations, abilities, opportunities, etc.
2. The ELM predicts that there are a variety of psychological processes of change that operate to varying degrees as a function of a person's level of elaboration. On the lower end of the continuum are the processes that require relatively little thought, including classical conditioning and mere exposure. On the higher end of the continuum are processes that require relatively more thought, including expectancy-value and cognitive response processes. When lower elaboration processes predominate, a person is said to be using the peripheral route, which is contrasted with the central route, involving the operation of predominantly high elaboration processes.
3. The ELM predicts that the degree of thought used in a persuasion context determines how consequential the resultant attitude becomes. Attitudes formed via high-thought, central-route processes will tend to persist over time, resist persuasion, and be influential in guiding other judgments and behaviors to a greater extent than attitudes formed through low-thought, peripheral-route processes.
4. The ELM also predicts that any given variable can have multiple roles in persuasion, including acting as a cue to judgment or as an influence on the direction of thought about a message. The ELM holds that the specific role by which a variable operates is determined by the extent of elaboration.

== Assumptions ==
Assumption 1: "People are motivated to hold correct attitudes"

Assumption 2: "Although people want to hold correct attitudes, the amount and nature of issue relevant elaboration in which they are willing or able to engage to evaluate a message vary with individual and situational factors"

Assumption 3: "Variables can affect the amount and direction of attitude change by:

Serving as persuasive arguments;

Serving as peripheral cues; and/or

Affecting the extent or direction of issue and argument elaboration"

Assumption 4: "Variables affecting motivation and/or ability to process a message in a relatively objective manner can do so by either enhancing or reducing argument scrutiny"

Assumption 5: "Variables affecting message processing in a relatively biased manner can produce either a positive (favorable) or negative (unfavorable) motivational and/or ability bias to the issue-relevant thoughts attempted"

Assumption 6: "As motivation and/or ability to process arguments is decreased, peripheral cues become relatively more important determinants of persuasion. Conversely, as argument scrutiny is increased, peripheral cues become relatively less important determinants of persuasion."

Assumption 7: "Attitude changes that result mostly from processing issue-relevant arguments (central route) will show greater temporal persistence, greater prediction of behavior and greater resistance to counter-persuasion than attitude changes that result mostly from peripheral cues."

== Routes ==
The elaboration likelihood model proposes two distinct routes for information processing: a central route and a peripheral route. The ELM holds that there are numerous specific processes of change on the "elaboration continuum" ranging from low to high. When the operation processes at the low end of the continuum determine attitudes, persuasion follows the peripheral route. When the operation processes at the high end of the continuum determine attitudes, persuasion follows the central route.

- Under the central route, persuasion will likely result from a person's careful and thoughtful consideration of the true merits of the information presented in support of an advocacy. The central route involves a high level of message elaboration in which a great amount of cognition about the arguments are generated by the individual receiving the message. The results of attitude change will be relatively enduring, resistant, and predictive of behavior.
- On the other hand, under the peripheral route, persuasion results from a person's association with positive or negative cues in the stimulus or making a simple inference about the merits of the advocated position. The cues received by the individual under the peripheral route are generally unrelated to the logical quality of the stimulus. These cues will involve factors such as the credibility or attractiveness of the sources of the message, or the production quality of the message. The likelihood of elaboration will be determined by an individual's motivation and ability to evaluate the argument being presented. Examples: Routes of ELM (central and peripheral)

=== Central route ===
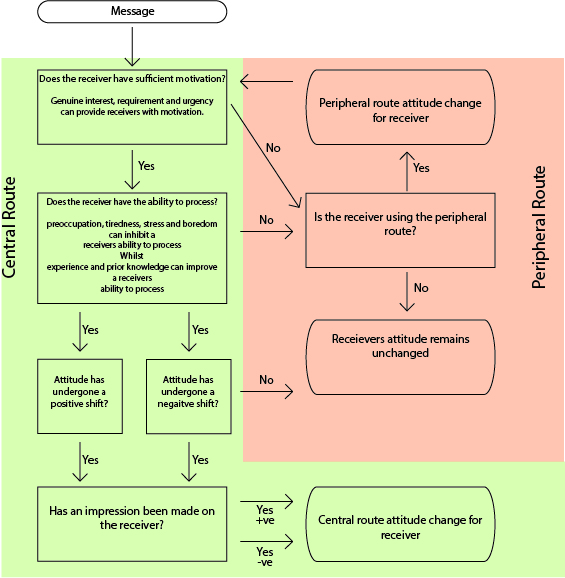
ELM diagram

The central route is used when the message recipient has the motivation as well as the ability to think about the message and its topic. When people process information centrally, the cognitive responses, or elaborations, will be much more relevant to the information, whereas when processing peripherally, the individual may rely on heuristics and other rules of thumb when elaborating on a message. Being at the high end of the elaboration continuum, people assess object-relevant information in relation to schemas that they already possess, and arrive at a reasoned attitude that is supported by information. It is important to consider two types of factors that influence how and how much one will elaborate on a persuasive message. The first are the factors that influence our motivation to elaborate, and the second are the factors that influence our ability to elaborate. Motivation to process the message may be determined by a personal interest in the subject of the message, or individual factors like the need for cognition. However, if the message recipient has a strong negative attitude toward the position proposed by the message, a boomerang effect (an opposite effect) is likely to occur. That is, they will resist the message and may move away from the proposed position. Two advantages of the central route are that attitude changes tend to last longer and are more predictive of behavior than the changes from the peripheral route. Overall, as people's motivation and ability to process the message and develop elaborations decreases, the peripheral cues present in the situation become more important in their processing of the message.

=== Peripheral route ===
The peripheral route is used when the message recipient has little or no interest in the subject and/or has a lesser ability to process the message. Being at the low end of the elaboration continuum, recipients do not examine the information as thoroughly. With the peripheral route, they are more likely to rely on general impressions (e.g. "this feels right/good"), early parts of the message, their own mood, positive and negative cues of the persuasion context, etc. Because people are "cognitive misers", looking to reduce mental effort, they often use the peripheral route and thus rely on heuristics (mental shortcuts) when processing information. When an individual is not motivated to centrally process an issue because they lack interest in it, or if the individual does not have the cognitive ability to centrally process the issue, then these heuristics can be quite persuasive. Robert Cialdini's Principles of Social Influence (1984), which include commitment, social proof, scarcity, reciprocation, authority, as well as liking the person who is persuading you, are some examples of frequently used heuristics. In addition, credibility can also be used as a heuristic in peripheral thinking because when a speaker is seen as having a higher credibility, then the listener may be more likely to believe the message. Credibility is a low-effort and somewhat reliable way to give us an answer of what to decide and/or believe without having to put in much work to think it through. Peripheral route processing involves a low level of elaboration. The user is not scrutinizing the message for its effectiveness.

If these peripheral influences go completely unnoticed, the message recipient is likely to maintain their previous attitude towards the message. Otherwise, the individual will temporarily change his attitude towards it. This attitude change can be long-lasting, although durable change is less likely to occur than it is with the central route.

== Determinants of route ==
The two most influential factors that affect which processing route an individual uses are motivation (the desire to process the message; see Petty and Cacioppo, 1979) and ability (the capability for critical evaluation; see Petty, Wells and Brock, 1976). The extent of motivation is in turn affected by attitude and personal relevance. Individuals' ability for elaboration is affected by distractions, their cognitive busyness (the extent to which their cognitive processes are engaged by multiple tasks), and their overall knowledge.

=== Motivation ===
Attitudes towards a message can affect motivation. Drawing from cognitive dissonance theory, when people are presented with new information (a message) that conflicts with existing beliefs, ideas, or values, they will be motivated to eliminate the dissonance, in order to remain at peace with their own thoughts. For instance, people who want to believe that they will be academically successful may recall more of their past academic successes than their failures. They may also use their world knowledge to construct new theories about how their particular personality traits may predispose them to academic success (Kunda, 1987). If they succeed in accessing and constructing appropriate beliefs, they may feel justified in concluding that they will be academically successful, not realizing that they also possess knowledge that could be used to support the opposite conclusion.

Motivation and ability

Personal relevance can also affect an individual's degree of motivation. For instance, undergraduate students were told of a new exam policy that would take effect either one or ten years later. The proposal of the new exam policy was either supported by strong or weak arguments. Those students who were going to personally be affected by this change would think more about the issue than those students who were not going to be personally affected.

An additional factor that affects degree of motivation is an individual's need for cognition. Individuals who take greater pleasure in thinking than others tend to engage in more effortful thinking because of its intrinsic enjoyment for them, regardless of the importance of the issue to them or the need to be correct.

=== Ability ===
Ability includes the availability of cognitive resources (for instance, the absence of time pressures or distractions) and the relevant knowledge needed to examine arguments. Distractions (for instance, noise in a library where a person is trying to read a journal article) can decrease a person's ability to process a message. Cognitive busyness, which can also serve as a distraction, limits the cognitive resources otherwise available for the task at hand (assessing a message). Another factor of ability is familiarity with the relevant subject. Though they might not be distracted nor cognitively busy, their insufficiency in knowledge can hinder people's engagement in deep thinking.

=== Opportunity ===
Some psychologists lump opportunity in with Ability as it primarily relates to the time available to the individual to make a decision. The popular train of thought today is that this is a category of its own. Factors related to ability to think includes: time pressure, message repetition, distraction, knowledge, fatigue, social pressure, etc.

Message repetition enables more argument scrutiny. If the argument is strong, repetition leads to more change in attitude. For example, in marketing research, advertising leads to a favorable brand attitude as long as the arguments are strong and tedium is not induced. However, it is noticeable that repetition does not always lead to more attitude change. The effect of repetition also depends on other factors such as content of argument, and previous knowledge and attitude.

When Distraction is high, elaboration is lower due to limited mental power. In this case, people are less influenced by the quality of the argument in a persuasive message. Rather, they focus on simple source cues. Keeping other factors constant, a stronger argument leads to more attitude change when distraction is low; and a weak argument could lead to more attitude change when distraction is high.

== Variables ==
A variable is essentially anything that can increase or decrease the persuasiveness of a message. Attractiveness, mood and expertise are just a few examples of variables that can influence persuasiveness. Variables can serve as arguments or peripheral cues to affect the persuasiveness of a message. According to the ELM, changing the quality of an argument or providing a cue in a persuasive context could influence the persuasiveness of a message and affect receivers' attitudes.

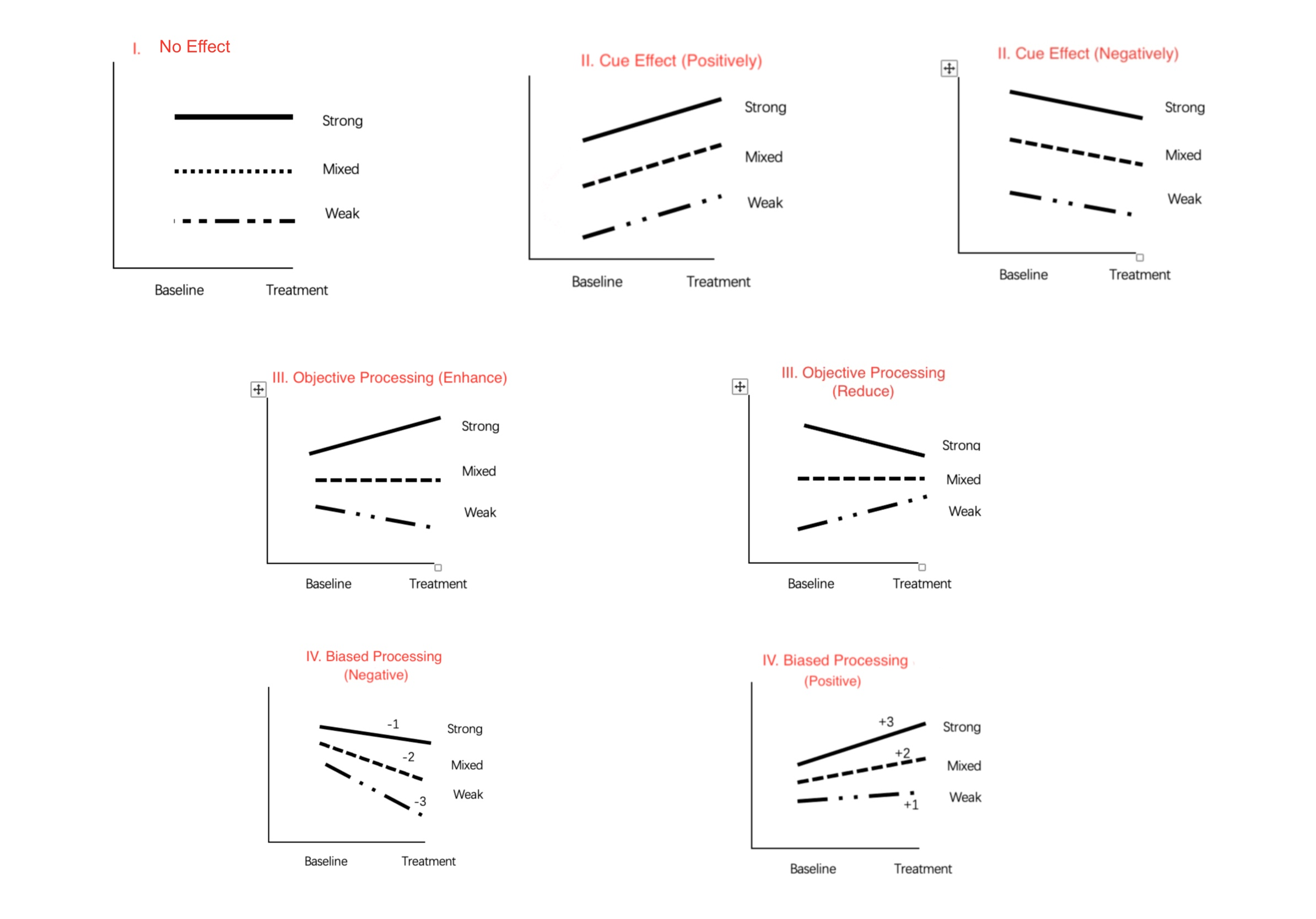
Figure I shows under high elaboration arguments have strong impact on the persuasiveness. Figure II shows under low elaboration cues serve as factors affecting attitudes. Figure III shows under moderate elaboration variables can affect motivation and ability to process in an objective manner and enhance or reduce persuasion. Figure IV illustrates that under moderate elaboration variables can affect motivation and ability to process in a biased manner and motivate or inhibit subjects to respond in a certain way.

Under high elaboration, a given variable (e.g., expertise) can serve as an argument (e.g., "If Einstein agrees with the theory of relativity, then this is a strong reason for me to as well") or a biasing factor (e.g., "If an expert agrees with this position it is probably good, so let me see who else agrees with this conclusion"), at the expense of contradicting information. Under low-elaboration conditions, a variable may act as a peripheral cue (e.g., the belief that "experts are always right"). While this is similar to the Einstein example above, this is a shortcut which (unlike the Einstein example) does not require thought. Under moderate elaboration, a variable may direct the extent of information processing (e.g., "If an expert agrees with this position, I should really listen to what they have to say"). If subjects are under conditions of moderate elaboration, variables might enhance or reduce the persuasiveness in an objective manner, or bialy motivate or inhibit subjects to generate a certain thought. For instance, a distraction could serve as a variable to objectively affect the persuasiveness of a message. The distraction will enhance the persuasion of a weak argument but reduce the persuasion of a strong argument. (As the Figure III (Reduce) suggests.)

Recent scholars studied persuasion combining ELM with another concept self-validation: to affect the extent to which a person trusts their thoughts in response to a message (self-validation role). A person not only needs to have an attitude towards a message, but also needs to trust their own attitude as correct one so this message can influence their behaviors. If they do not deem themself as correct, they will mentally abandon their own thought. Because of its metacognitive nature, self-validation only occurs in high-elaboration conditions. The ELM posts that variables (credulity, happiness, etc.) can influence the amount and direction of processing, and self-validation postulates that those variables can affect how people use their thoughts as well. For example, when people are generating favorable thoughts about a new idea, they will be more self-affirmed if they are nodding their heads (a variable). Conversely, if they are shaking their heads, they will be less self-affirmed about their thoughts. (See more examples in Postures)

== Consequences ==
For an individual intent on forming long-lasting beliefs on topics, the central route is advantageous by the fact that arguments are scrutinized intensely and that information is unlikely to be overlooked. However, this route uses a considerable amount of energy, time, and mental effort.

It is not worthwhile to exert considerable mental effort to achieve correctness in all situations and people do not always have the requisite knowledge, time, or opportunity to thoughtfully assess the merits of a proposal. For those, the use of the peripheral route excels at saving energy, time, and mental effort. This is particularly advantageous in situations in which one must make a decision within a small time constraint. On the other hand, the peripheral route is prone to errors in judgment, at least in attributing reasons for behaviors. Also, people are persuaded in peripheral routes based on import cues such as credibility of the information source. However, the sleeper effect could influence the strength of persuasion.

It is noteworthy that high elaboration does not necessarily lead to attitude change. Resistance to persuasion occurs when someone feels their freedom to perform a certain behavior is threatened. A famous study on reaction is conducted by Pennebaker and Sanders in 1976. The experimenters placed placard in campus toilets to discourage graffiti. The result of experiment suggests the amount of graffiti written on the threatening placards was significantly positively related to both authority and threat level. Findings are interpreted as reflecting reactance arousal.

In addition, inoculation theory must also be taken into account when it comes to persuasion.

== Applications ==
Researchers have applied the elaboration likelihood model to many fields, including advertising, marketing, consumer behavior and health care, just to name a few.

=== In advertising and marketing ===
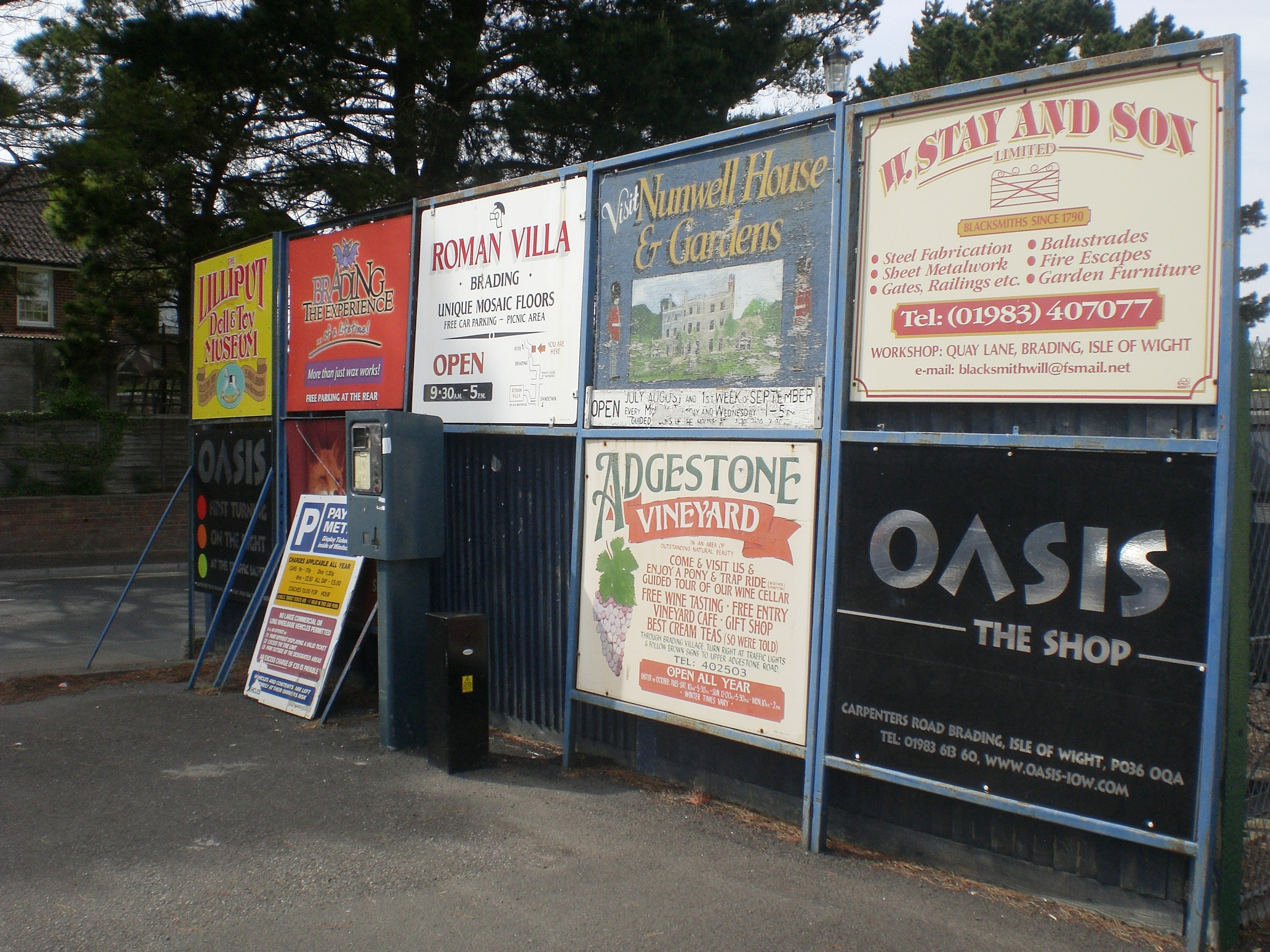
Advertising

The elaboration likelihood model can be applied to advertising and marketing.

In 1983, Petty, Cacioppo and Schumann conducted a study to examine source effects in advertising. It was a product advertisement about a new disposable razor. The authors purposefully made one group of subjects highly involved with the product, by telling them the product would be test marketed soon in the local area and by the end of the experiment they would be given a chance to get a disposable razor. Whereas, the authors made another group of subjects have low involvement with the product by telling them that the product would be test marketed in a distant city and by the end of the experiment they would have the chance to get a toothpaste. In addition to varying involvement, the authors also varied source and message characteristics by showing a group of the subjects ads featuring popular athletes, whereas showing other subjects ads featuring average citizens; showing some subjects ads with strong arguments and others ads with weak arguments. This experiment shows that when the elaboration likelihood was low, featuring famous athletes in the advertisement would lead to more favorable product attitudes, regardless of the strength of the product attributes presented. Whereas when elaboration likelihood was high, only the argument strength would manipulate affected attitudes. Lee et al. supported the studies on that product involvement strengthens the effects of "endorser–product congruence on consumer responses" when the endorsers expertise is well related with product to create source credibility. Lee's finding also helps to understand celebrity endorsement as not only a peripheral cue but also a motivation for central route.

Later in 1985, Bitner, Mary J., and Carl Obermiller expand this model theoretically in the field of marketing. They proposed in the marketing context, the determinant of routes is more complex, involving variables of situation, person, and product categories.

It is widely acknowledged that effects of ads are not only limited to the information contained in the ad alone but are also a function of the different appeals used in the ads (like use celebrities or non-celebrities as endorsers). In a study conducted by Rollins and Bhutada in 2013, ELM theory was the framework used to understand and evaluate the underlying mechanisms describing the relationships between endorser type, disease state involvement and consumer response to direct-to-consumer advertisements (DTCA). The finding showed while endorser type did not significantly affect consumer attitudes, behavioral intentions and information search behavior; level of disease state involvement, though, did. More highly involved consumers had more positive attitudes, behavioral intentions and greater information search behavior.

Since social media become a popular marketing platform as well, some scholars also use the ELM to examine how purchase intentions, brand attitudes, and advertising attitudes could be affected by interactivity and source authority on social media platforms. Ott et al. conducted an experiment by presenting participants with Facebook posts from a fictitious company and analyzing their attitude change. The results shows that high and medium interactivity (which means numbers of responses from company representatives on social media posts would: 1) enhance the perceived informativeness (consumers can get useful information from advertising), and then strengthen positive attitudes and purchase intentions; Or 2) increase perceived dialogues, which led to increasing perceived informativeness and then positive attitudes and purchase intentions. However, high interactivity without the perceived informativeness would generate negative attitudes and low purchase intentions. This study has suggested that to some extent companies should engage audience in a systematic processing way in social media advertisings, as consumers elaborate along central route will generate more positive attitudes and higher purchase intentions.

In 2021, author R. K. Srivastava conducted a study to find the effectiveness of films, sports, mascots, and celebrities regarding advertisements for consumers. The studies showed none of the metrics listed above had a significant effect on the purchasing habits of "educated working consumers," which means they either have graduate or post-graduate degrees. However, if the content was perceived as suitable by the consumer, and the figure advertising the product was credible in the eyes of the consumer, they would be more likely to purchase the product.

Authors Alexis Campbell and Jee Young Chung published an article in the spring of 2022 that explored how consumers reacted to social media advertisements featuring alcohol across the platforms of Facebook, Instagram, and Twitter. The ELM was used to conduct the study. The ads would feature 12 of the most popular beer brands in the world, and in the ads, they would be linked to other activities that consumers would enjoy. For example, if an ad attempted to gain the attention of consumers who enjoy the season of summer, the ad would say "Coors Light: A cool drink for the summer." Studies showed that codes like the example previously listed increased a consumer's likelihood to purchase alcohol.

The elaboration likelihood model has been used extensively in advertising products as well as services, such as online health communities. A 2022 study conducted by researchers at China's Northwest University and the University of Science and Technology Beijing used the central route and peripheral route of the ELM to analyze two stages of the product adoption process, first adoption and post-adoption, in online health communities in Chinese healthcare. Technical and interpersonal quality of doctors' medical service were regarded as cues to the central route. In contrast, electronic word-of-mouth was regarded as a cue to the peripheral route of the ELM. Interaction quality and electronic word of mouth had a significant impact on the first adoption of physician services; however, information quality did not, which proved inconsistent with the ELM. Researchers concluded these inconsistencies may have been caused by users' lack of knowledge in specific fields, including the validity of certain health-related information. The quality of the physicians in online health communities impacts the patient's perception of the physician. Another possible explanation was the various levels of information quality from different methods. Online bookings with service in physical hospitals had the highest information quality; however, patients who did not want to go to physical hospitals found telephone service to have sufficient information quality. This study is just one example of the ELM being used in advertising.

In a 2023 report on promotional messages for trust within mobile banking was deemed that individuals with more privacy and security concerns in regard to mobile banking tend to rely more on central route processing to evaluate whether or not to trust the mobile banking service. Trust is the vital area in deciding whether or not to sign up for and adopt to mobile banking. In order to accommodate for those hesitant to adopt, the advertisers need to use promotional messages to address the potential customers concerns by giving quality and persuasive messages to alleviate their fears.

Sigal Segev and Juliana Fernandes published a study in January 2023 to evaluate the use of the ELM and its central and peripheral processing routes to evaluate viral advertisements between 2009 and 2019. The study found that the viral video ads contained more peripheral rather than central cues. Similarly, Piao Pan and Hao Zhang published "Research on Social Media Advertising Persuasion Based on the Elaboration Likelihood Model" based on 309 valid questionnaires collected as empirical data and found that when advertisements tried to be more persuasive, consumers were more likely to take the central processing route and become more involved in the content. On the other hand, when advertisements tried to be more informative, consumers were more likely to take the peripheral processing route and be less involved. The authors argued that this was because of "information overload" a case where the consumer has too much data to try to digest. Pan and Zhang said this is an important note because it shows that marketers should work harder on the persuasiveness of their arguments and avoid "simply stacking information".

Playing into the trust of the adopters into the mobile banking, advertisers should not take the same approach to get different demographics of individuals to sign up for their mobile banking services. If they decide to advertise in a social media environment, they should tailor ads to individuals. In general, the message source credibility is a more impactful than electric word of mouth with an emotional appeal. However, women respond more to an emotional appeal, while men rely more often on source credibility, more of a central route approach. Alongside the gendered specific approach, there is also an age approach. More mature users are more responsive in overall than younger users. Possibly due to the desensitization of younger users due to more exposure to social media and the marketing that comes along with it. A way that the advertisers can gain more source credibility is by utilizing opinion leaders in their advertisements. Opinion leaders bolster information spread through central route processing. Fans/followers of the opinion leaders are more likely to forward messages and engage in depth. The choice of what opinion leader is to be utilized in the advertisement needs to be deliberate as well. The influencer's originality, uniqueness, and informativeness of posts directly influence purchase intention according to a 2023 study. The more that the opinion leader stands out, the more likely the audience is to engage in whatever is being advertised, in depth. It would also be useful to target an audience with different knowledge levels with different strategies to get them to adopt. In a 2024 study about how social media influenced wine tourists' decision making it was determined that individuals with greater knowledge of wine were more driven by messages with perceived utility. Individuals with lesser knowledge of wine were more driven by opinion leaders, in this case mostly social media influencers. Those more knowledgeable and assumingly more engaged in a given topic may be more likely to be motivated as to what they can get out of a product or experience. Those with less knowledgeable are more likely to listen to those they trust when making the decision rather than their own analysis of the situation. In order to get the most interaction from an advertisement or a marketing scheme, the look of the spokesperson may be more influential then you would think. The "attractiveness" of the influencer has interaction and purchase effects. Trustworthiness also helps. The "attractiveness" acts as a peripheral cue. It creates a positive association between the product being marketed and the "attractive" person as well as an attention grabber. Simply just getting someone's attention can be very impactful. Attention is a major contributor and predictor to cognitive and affective responses and elaborations.

Source credibility is paramount in marketing anything. The viewer is drawn to credibility and is more likely to take that message to heart as displayed in a 2023 study on source credibility in reviews. Another 2023 study emphasizes how source credibility is used as a way to sell products, and it had effects in particular on experimental products. While source credibility may help with thought out purchases (central cues), impulse purchases can be influenced by emotion (peripheral cues). It is important to tailor these approaches to the consumer groups desired to purchase the product. Understanding the pathways of ELM can optimize the advertising.

An example of what not to do is found in a 2025 study of the messaging behind antimicrobial resistance. The information on it is hard to find, its not integrated into medical practices, poorly promoted, and the terminology is too technical. Those alongside contradictory messaging and no emotional punch or cultural relevance result in low elaboration and minimal attitude changes. Low argument quality and lack of persuasive cues hurt central and peripheral processing. To have a successful marketing campaign, it is required for the audience to understand what is being said, or have them believe they do. With information being sparse and the terminology being too technical, not many individuals can understand what is being said. That, along with no emotional persuasive cues, the messaging is lacking both peripheral and central cues. A marketing campaign needs to have those cues to draw in the audience. When focusing on these cues it may be important to know where the message will be received, geographically and within social circles not identified by location. Peripheral route processing is influenced by social norms as well as message framing. Some messages are not acceptable in different places or to some people. Without attaining peoples trust, or at least gaining their attention, and keeping it, the result will be low elaboration and small attitude changes toward the company or product.

While other messages are ideal to a group. As demonstrated in a 2024 study on the impact of strength of ethnic identification among African American consumers on services advertising evaluations. This suggests that the advertising geared toward a specific ethnic group (in this case African Americans specifically) enhances brand love and loyalty among the ethnic group targeted by the advertisement. Ad cues relating to social identities can enhance brand relationships. Different communities represented allows for more emotional engagement and persuasive impact. Similar to the "attractiveness" of the influencer, seeing more diverse ethnic groups can act as a positive association between those in the advertisement and the brand itself. These advertisement types are more effective with motivations fueled by emotion. It is important for an organization to know their target audience. Gaining trust of the potential adopter is vital to getting engagement and investment, as demonstrated in a 2025 study on adopting ai-enabled loan schemes. Central cues include loan scheme quality, reputation of lending institution, structural assurance, and peripheral cues include social influence, and inclination to trust. These all enhance trust in the ai loan schemes. With trust in central and or peripheral routes, it increases likelihood of adoption.

==== Caveat ====
- However, when looking into advertising among young people, Te'eni-Harari et al. found out that in contradistinction to adults, ELM does not hold true for the young. Instead of two information processing routes, young people are less influenced by motivation and ability variables, hence only one route. Their findings also indicate young people are representative of the less intellectually oriented population at large, who probably only have one route to process information.
- Although using peripheral cues is a persuasive choice, advertisers need to be extremely careful in addressing some issues to avoid controversy, such as using sacred symbols as peripheral cues in advertising.

=== In healthcare ===
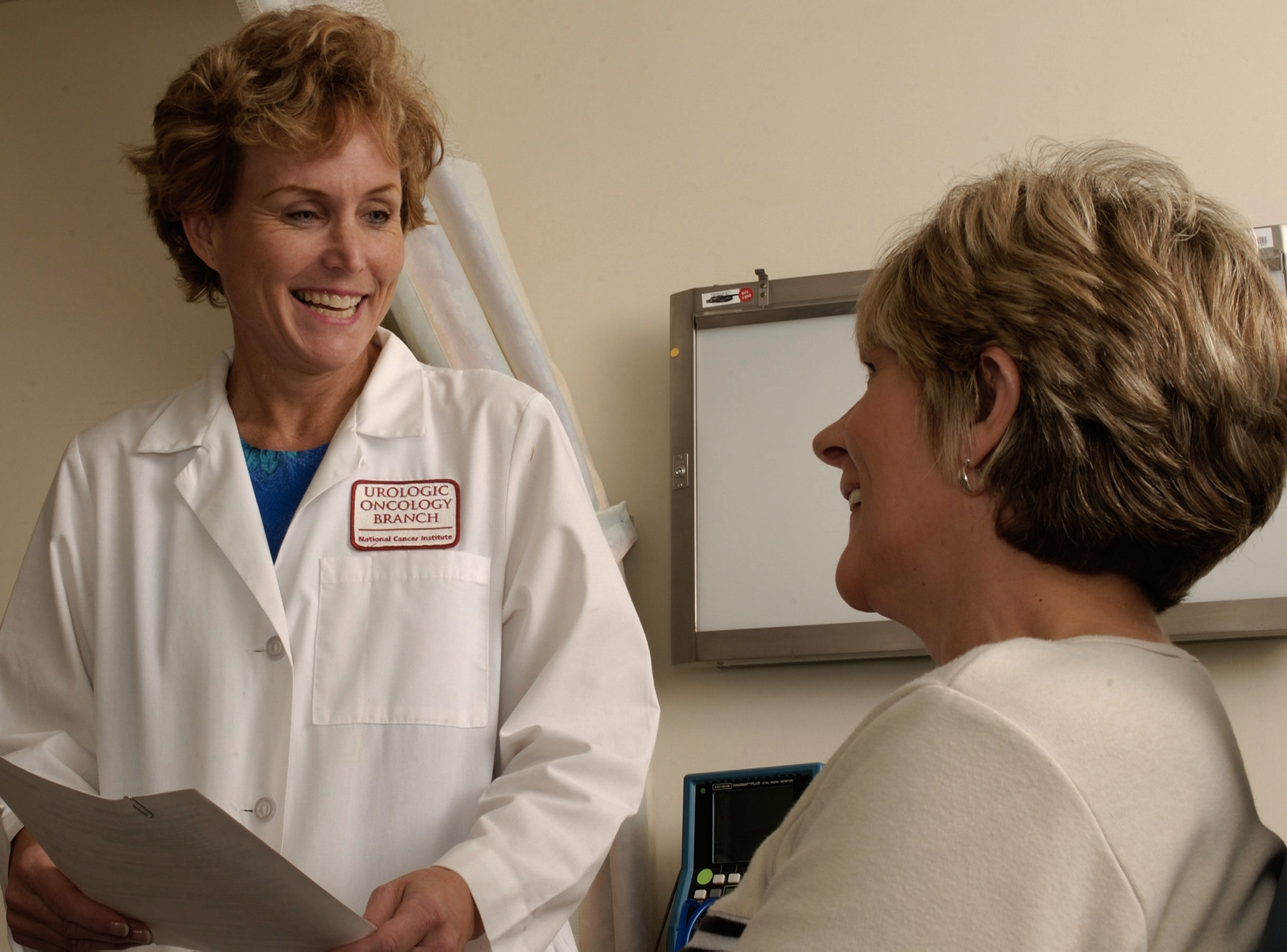
Healthcare

Recent research has been conducted to apply the ELM to the healthcare field. In 2009, Angst and Agarwal published a research article, "Adoption of Electronic Health Records in the Presence of Privacy Concerns: the Elaboration Likelihood Model and Individual Persuasion". This research studies electronic health records (EHRs), (an individual's) concern for information privacy (CFIP) and the elaboration likelihood model (ELM). The two researchers aimed to investigate the question, "Can individuals be persuaded to change their attitudes and opt-in behavioral intentions toward EHRs, and allow their medical information to be digitized even in the presence of significant privacy concerns?"

When the COVID-19 pandemic first broke out in 2020, authorities relied heavily on persuasion tactics for the population to adopt behavior changes so they could control the outbreak. Mark W. Susmann et al. published a study in the European Review of Social Psychology that described the use of the elaboration likelihood model to organize persuasion tactics used to conclude which ones led to behavior change based on the level of interest and motivation to respond. The study described the theory as, "useful" when using it to analyze persuasion amidst the pandemic "as it allows health communicators to identify variables that are likely to lead to the greatest amount of persuasion depending on whether recipients are likely to process the message deeply."

In a 2023 study on information acceptance during the COVID-19 pandemic, it was suggested that accuracy and timeliness significantly increase perceived information usefulness. Completeness did not significantly affect usefulness via a central route. Consistency and credibility positively influence usefulness, and quantity has no significant effect via the peripheral route. Emotional and social cues are very effective, as well as accurate, timely and credible health information.

Denise Scannell et al. published a study in the Journal of Health Communications that looked specifically into the discourse surrounding vaccines on Twitter by using the elaboration likelihood model to study the differences between pro-vaccine and anti-vaccine messages. The study found that pro-vaccine messages relied heavily on the central processing route while anti-vaccine messages used the peripheral processing route more, but the difference wasn't as drastic.

Since the ELM model provides an understanding how to influence attitudes, the said model could be leveraged to alter perceptions and attitudes regarding adoption and adaptation of change.

Findings of the research included:

- "Issue involvement and argument framing interact to influence attitude change, and that concern for information privacy further moderates the effects of these variables."
- "Likelihood of adoption is driven by concern for information privacy and attitude."
- "An individual's CFIP interacts with argument framing and issue involvement to affect attitudes toward EHR use and CFIP directly influence opt-in behavioral intentions."
- "Even people who have high concerns for privacy, their attitudes can be positively altered with appropriate message framing."

Similar to the methods used during the COVID-19 pandemic, a 2023 study conducted by researchers of Australia's University of Wollongong and University of New South Wales used the ELM to study the interpretation of nutritional messages to those living with multiple sclerosis (MS), based on systematic reviews examining the relationship between MS and nutrition. Studies have shown programs regarding diet and nutrition for people living with multiple sclerosis have had a positive impact, as they assist with acceptance and allow people to feel they are in control. Studies in the United States have also shown that up to 70% of people living with MS will try diet as a form of therapy for MS. The ELM was used to sort findings into targeted messages based on three categories with the most substantial evidence: Vitamin D, fatty acids, and dietary diversity, which were used to create persuasive messages using practical examples and motivators. These messages used the Australian National Dietary Guidelines, which specify what types of foods to eat, not what nutrients to eat, as it was determined people associate eating with foods and not with nutrients. Positive and adverse reactions to the messages led to the acceptance and dismissal of the information, respectively. Participants who were more recently diagnosed with multiple sclerosis tended to be more open-minded to new nutritional information yet skeptical towards "extremist" diets. On the other hand, participants who had been living with MS for a longer period were more likely to participate in extremist diets but were less open-minded in accepting new nutrition information. This directly relates to the peripheral route of the ELM, as someone living with MS could have preconceived perceptions preventing them from obtaining new, even credible, information.

=== In e-commerce ===
Chen and Lee conducted a study about online shopping persuasion by applying the elaboration likelihood model back to 2008. In this study, how online shopping influences consumers' beliefs and perceived values on attitude and approach behavior were examined. "Twenty cosmetics and 20 hotel websites were selected for participants to randomly link to and read, and the students were then asked to fill in a 48-item questionnaire via the internet. It was found that when consumers have higher levels of agreeableness and conscientiousness, central route website contents would be more favorable for eliciting utilitarian shopping value; whereas when consumers have higher levels of emotional stability, openness, and extraversion, peripheral route website contents would be more critical in facilitating experiential and hedonic shopping value", Chen explained.

In 2009, another study about the effects of consumer skepticism on online shopping was conducted by Sher and Lee. Data on young customers' attitudes about a product were acquired through an online experiment with 278 college students, and two findings emerged after analysis. First, highly skeptical consumers tend to stick with their original impression than been influenced by other factors (Central Route); which means, they are biased against certain types of information and indifferent to the message quality. Second, consumers with low skepticism tend to adopt the peripheral route in forming attitude; that is, they are more persuaded by online review quantity. Lee indicated, "these findings contribute to the ELM research literature by considering a potentially important personality factor in the ELM framework". Another study regarding college students, conducted in early 2024 by Junjie Shi looked at product placement within Bilibili science videos. Bilibili is a Chinese service that functions like a cross between Twitch and YouTube, using aspects of both platforms. This study examined how the success of a video contributed to a product's purchase. The study analyzed 511 science-related videos on Bilibili, employing ELM to examine factors such as video thumbnails, creator identity, and production. The study found that the more credible or more viewed videos performed better at selling products. This study concluded that video creators should focus on creating well produced videos. These ideas align with the central route of the ELM. People prefer shorter, more concise content over lengthier videos, making them more willing to engage.

A more recent study in 2023 looked at the effects of streamers on viewers online shopping habits. This study conducted by Xi Luo, Jun-Hwa Cheah, and Linda D. Hollebeek on over 750 millennials in China and their online spending habits. The study applied the ELM to online livestream shopping by looking at how millennials would react to other customers' impulsive spending tendencies, ways the people got persuaded, and how different information influenced decisions. With the advancements in live streaming, it's become a more prominent aspect of everyday life. Streamers can make a living and impact people's lives from the comfort of their own homes. The streamers engagement levels, viewership, and credibility are all examined to see how the ELM affects consumers buying habits. The study showed streamers with a higher viewership, more engagement, and more credibility were more likely to sell a product. Whereas a smaller creator would struggle to sell a product. The study also showed that online shopping, mainly due to streaming, caused an increase in impulse buys. Impulse buying is significantly more prevalent in developing economies like China and India. Because of all the exposure to new items from social media, online shopping has grown exponentially over the past couple of years. The streaming market has become oversaturated because of this, it is clearly shown in the study which, concluded that "approximately 1.23 million streamers are struggling with low conversion rates on selling products." Many people are pursuing careers in streaming due to its chance of rapid success and top rate pay if they can reach the top level of streamers. Big streamers can succeed because of the impulsive purchasing nature of their viewers, so if they promote a variety of ads that appeal to their audience the most; then they will see the most growth.

Other studies applied ELM in e-commerce and internet related fields are listed below for your additional references:

- How does web personalization affect users attitudes and behaviors online?
- An eye-tracking study of online shopping to understand how customers use ELM in their e-commerce experience.
- Using an elaboration likelihood approach to better understand the persuasiveness of website privacy assurance cues for online consumers.
- Multichannel retailing's use of central and peripheral routes through Internet and cross-channel platforms.
- Using ELM and signaling theory to analyze Internet recruitment.

=== In media ===
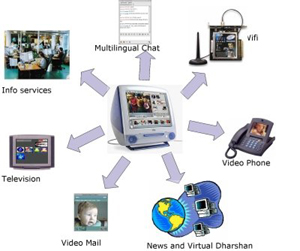
Media

Scholars have studied whether media modalities will serve as variable to affect which processing route to take. The previous researches by Chaiken suggested that audio and video modes tended to led receivers to heuristic processing (taking the peripheral route) rather than engage in systematic processing (taking the central route). Bootb-Butterfield and Gutowski have studied how media modalities, argument quality, and source credibility interact to influence receivers to process messages. Bootb-Butterfield and Gutowski conducted an experiment by providing students with strong or weak arguments from high or low credible sources in print, audio, or video modes. By giving participants with negative thought topics, experiment results shows that media modalities, source credibility, and argument quality have significant interactions in attitudes change and elaboration mounts: Within the print mode, the interaction between source credibility and argument quality was the least, partly confirmed that print mode would generate systematic processing. And participants generated more unfavorable thoughts towards weak arguments than strong arguments. Within the audio mode, there was no difference between weak and strong arguments with low credible sources; But, weak arguments with high credible sources generate more unfavorable thoughts than strong arguments. Within the video mode, arguments with low credible sources had no difference in elaboration mounts, while strong arguments with high credible sources produced more thoughts.

Many else research on how media content triggered the central or peripheral processing and lead to attitude change. In order to reduce youth smoking by developing improved methods to communicate with higher risk youth, Flynn and his colleagues conducted a study in 2013, exploring the potential of smoking prevention messages on TV based on the ELM. "Structured evaluations of 12 smoking prevention messages based on three strategies derived from the ELM were conducted in classroom settings among a diverse sample of non-smoking middle school students in three states. Students categorized as likely to have higher involvement in a decision to initiate cigarette smoking, are reported relatively high ratings on a cognitive processing indicator for messages focused on factual arguments about negative consequences of smoking than for messages with fewer or no direct arguments. Message appeal ratings did not show greater preference for this message type among higher involved versus lower involved students. Ratings from students reporting lower academic achievement suggested difficulty processing factual information presented in these messages. The ELM may provide a useful strategy for reaching adolescents at risk for smoking initiation, but particular attention should be focused on lower academic achievers to ensure that messages are appropriate for them."

Another research directed by Boyce and Kuijer was focusing on media body ideal images triggers food intake among restrained eaters based on ELM. Their hypotheses were based on restraint theory and the ELM. From the research, they found participants' attention (advertent/inadvertent) toward the images was manipulated. Although restrained eaters' weight satisfaction was not significantly affected by either media exposure condition, advertent (but not inadvertent) media exposure triggered restrained eaters' eating. These results suggest that teaching restrained eaters how to pay less attention to media body ideal images might be an effective strategy in media–literary interventions.

Braverman researched on combining media modality and content design. She directed a study focusing on the persuasion effects of informational (anecdotal evidence) and testimonial messages (personal stories or experience) in text or audio modes. Study results supported that people in low issue-relevance would be persuaded more by testimonial messages, while people in high issue-relevance would be persuaded more by informational messages. She also found that text was more effective for informational messages, whereas audio was relatively more effective for testimonial messages.

With the development of the internet and the emerging new media, L. G. Pee (2012) has conduct interesting research on the influence of trust on social media using the ELM theory. The findings resulted that source credibility, the majority influence, and information quality has strong effect on the trust for users.

Scholars have also studied on how the ELM functions on Connective-collective action on social media. "Connective-collective activities" means ones are able to receive other's personal opinions and add responses to them, so the information will be accumulated and turned into a collective one. On social media there four types of activities are considered as connective-collective: 1) commenting; 2) uploading materials; 3) relaying information received; 4) affiliating (i.e. Liking, following, etc.). Nekmat et al. have suggested that the overabundance of information on social media might not induce audience to heuristic processing; instead, source attributes such as credibility and personalness (which means the closeness of friends in a circle) will be mediated by elaboration cognition. Nekmat et al. found that personalness was positively related to elaboration and users with elaboration cognition were more willing to participant in connective-collective activities. They speculated that this was due to the need to cross the private-public boundary when interacting on social media gave people burdens.

Molina and Jennings focused on whether civil and uncivil behaviors on Facebook serve as cues to encourage users' willingness to participant in a discussion. By presenting experiment participants with Facebook posts and comments (civil or uncivil), they found that: civil comments will encourage more elaboration and therefore generate more willingness to engage in a discussion than uncivil comments; the more elaboration participants generate, the more they are willing to participant in the discussion.

=== In Social Media ===
With the continuous growth of social media within our society as a means for news, information, and civil unrest, the ELM has been studied regarding its impact and trust across social media. Social media has one variable that relates closely to the ELM, that being its algorithm. In a study titled, More Accounts, Fewer Links: How Algorithmic Curation Impacts Media Exposure in Twitter Timelines by Jack Bandy he examined how Twitter's algorithm was created. Jack determined that Twitter more recently changed their algorithm to be curation timeline based. This means that depending on watch time, what is interacted with more, and what is shared the most is more likely to be seen again. Other social media apps use the same sort of model to make sure a person will see more videos related to what they like and interact with the most. With the use of the algorithm, social media can promote items as well. In a study by Jason Hartline examining the promotional styles across social media, he found that algorithmic questioning impacts revenue maximizing. Meaning that when buyers are interested and symmetric, then they are most likely to purchase. This algorithm takes a central route approach with the way it showed how a viewer with more interest would be more likely to purchase. Whereas the peripheral route within this study was with what he described as influence-and-exploit strategies. This strategy was were they would influence a set group of people by giving them free items, and then they extract revenue by using a greedy pricing strategy. This is seen constantly throughout social media in brands like Apple, Uber, and Dollar Shave Club. There are many different ways these two routes can be used or interpreted depending on the platform.

Qiang Liu, Fei Fei Su, Aruhan Mu, and Xiang Wu wrote an article on how social media affects people's psychological well-being. They stated that by using ELM they could use it as a "framework" to explain the attitude changes of the individuals. Gary C. Woodward and Robert E. Denton, Jr. who wrote "Persuasion and Influence in American Life" describe ELM saying, "We process information in different ways, depending on our levels interest the amount of time available"(Denton, Woodward 117). They used it as a framework by using the two distinct pathways of central and peripheral. The research they did was on WeChat, which is a popular social media for their research. They only used research from two years or earlier to ensure it was relevant to the current day. They determined how people processed the articles through a few characteristics. These were IQ, if they were positive, or if they were negative. They show this through experimentation using ELM to see how people make their decisions, and Elm helps clarify. They found that the quality of shared information affected how people responded. The lower the quality of information the more likely to have harmful emotional responses. They also found that people with depression are more likely to share harmful emotional content compared to other day-to-day users, to share opposing beliefs. They also found that people with a higher IQ are more likely to share information than those with a lower IQ. Also the higher the quality of information the likelier it will be shared. Similarly to another study done by Xiaoyi Zhang, Angelina Lilac Chen, Xinyang Piao, Manning Yu, Yakang Zhang, and Lihao Zhang who go into the innovation of Ai chatbots with a framework of ELM had some similar results. Similar results were that people do not respond positively depending on whether they are willing to accept the new Ai innovations. Similarly to the people who do not share positive content due to a depression.

==== On YouTube ====
YouTube has been a dominant form of social media since its creation in the early 2000's. Youtube had a monthly viewer base of 2 billion in the year 2020. With its constant popularity and dominance within the social media field, there have been countless studies and research that aim to find why it is so popular. A survey by Ana Munaro looked at how the ELM contributes to the success of YouTube. Her research is aimed to find out what features drive popularity on YouTube. Ana sampled over 11,000 videos and 150 different creators ranging from various categories. YouTube has a variety of elements that can be important to how someone feels about a particular video, creator, or topic. The study first researched language. Language is a vital part of YouTube and is an important piece of how consumers process information. A study by Kujur and Singh in 2018 showed how emotional appeal yields better consumer engagement and interaction. Another important part when regarding language is the usage of function vs content words. By researching the impact of function words when compared to content words, Ana saw videos with more function words had more positive results, like more comment engagement, virality, and likes/dislikes. Function words are easier to understand and generally more entertaining, these aspects are similar to the peripheral route of the ELM. Function words are not explicit, and they are more context dependant. Whereas content words are longer and more confusing, which is similar to the central route of the ELM. Objectivity and emotion is another area within YouTube videos that can be interpreted in either the central or peripheral route. This study showed that if a video contained more objectivity or emotion it would be more popular, have more views, and more engagement. These findings play further into the ELM because a viewer is likelier to pay attention and be interested in a more animated and seemingly engaging work. Aside from the linguistic side of the study, further research consisted of posting time throughout the day and its impact. For example, weekdays posts and non-business hour posts were the best times to have positive engagement. Overall the study showed the many different implications of how the ELM profoundly affects how a person reacts with videos across YouTube.

A study done by Ritik Raushan and Dr. Akansha Dubey researched how they use ELM to help examine what viewers on YouTube are drawn towards in terms of advertisements while using the site. ELM was helpful for them because it shows the two ways of processing information. Gary C. Woodward and Robert E. Denton, Jr. who wrote "Persuasion and Influence in American Life" describe ELM saying, "We process information in different ways, depending on our levels interest the amount of time available"(Denton, Woodward 117). This helped them study the ways that individuals will process the information that they are interested in, and are more likely to purchase. When doing their research they need to find ways to emotionally appeal to each individual and actually engage in the ad. They are trying to find what makes the viewer interested in the ad, and hopefully make them purchase something. They found that the ads on YouTube helped the companies sell more products, but more specifically get more views. This helps promote brand perception, awareness, and stronger brand associations. They found that the products that are most successful in selling are FMCG products. This means fast-moving consumer goods such as clothing, food, beverages, personal care items, etc. This is because people do not need to think about making the purchase as much as other larger purchases such as a car. As a result, companies advertising on a site like YouTube has a positive effect on the company, whether it be selling the product or simply explaining it to possibly get a future customer. In a similar study done by Qiang Liu, Fei Fei Su, Aruhan Mu, and Xiang Wu who researched how social media affects people's psychological well-being through ELM saw some similarities. They mainly had the emotional outcomes being similar such as a depressed person to share more harmful emotional content, and others showing negative signs through higher decision products such as a car.

=== In politics ===
The ELM has been studied with regard to its usefulness in politics and voting specifically. The work of Terry Chmielewski (University of Wisconsin-Eau Claire) found "moderate-to-strong support for the applicability of E-L-M to voting." This finding came through the study of voters in the 2004 and 2008 elections for President of the United States. Continuing on that thread, the work of Wood and Herbst found that, "family and significant others were more influential than celebrities in engendering support for a political candidate." This indicates that peripheral route processes may have some influence on some voters; however, family and friends are likely to be more influential than those who do not have a personal connection to specific voters. Hans-Joachim Mosler applied ELM to study if and how a minority can persuade the majority to change its opinion.

The study used Agent-based social simulation. There were five agents, three (or four) of whom held a neutral opinion on some abstract topic, while the other two (or one) held a different opinion. In addition, there were differences between the agents regarding their argument quality and peripheral cues. The simulation was done in rounds. In each round, one of the agents had an opportunity to influence the other agents. The level of influence was determined by either the argument strength (if the central route was taken) or the peripheral cues (if the peripheral route was taken). After two rounds of persuasion, the distance between the majority's original opinion to its new opinion was studied. It was found that, the peripheral cues of the minority were more important than the argument quality. I.e, a minority with strong arguments but negative cues (e.g., different skin-color or bad reputation) did not succeed in convincing the majority, while a minority with weak arguments and positive cues (e.g., appearance or reputation) did succeed. The results depend also on the level of personal relevance – how much the topic is important to the majority and to the minority.

Partisan Media impact on Persuasion

Scholars also studied how partisan cues in media content will affect elaboration direction and mount. Jennings combined social identity theory and elaboration likelihood model to study whether identities will motivate audience to only rely on partisan cues on media to process information, and whether partisan cues would inhibit audience from learning. Jennings's experiment provided participants with a nonpartisan or partisan article at first and used questionnaires to test their elaboration and learning outcomes. The results supported Jennings hypotheses: articles with partisan cues would prevent partisans from learning more information in the article, compared to articles without partisan cues. Besides, nonpartisan articles would relatively generate more positive thoughts than partisan articles. Also, partisan members tend to elaborate more negative thoughts when exposed to out-group's information, and partisan members will elaborate more positive thoughts when exposed to in-group's messages. For instance, Republicans will come out of more negative reasons why a Democrat senator should not be elected, while Democrats will generate more positive reasons to elect a Democrat senator.

Social Media impact on politics

ELM has been utilized to look at the effect of social media on politics. One study on the effect of Twitter on politics, by Wu, Wong, Deng, and Chang, found that certain types of tweets (1 central route, 1 peripheral route) are most effective in political persuasion. Informative tweets (central) have been shown to produce a consistent impact on opinion convergence. Affective tweets (peripheral) have been shown to be more inconsistent.

Social and Political Movements

In addition to politics, advertisements, and media, the ELM has been used also for social and political movements. A study published in 2017 used the ELM to discover who cares about the Black Lives Matter Movement the most. In the study, 541 participants from across the United States (black and white) analyzed news articles that were written by an African American professor, African American high-school student, a Caucasian American professor, and a Caucasian American high-school student, all whom are in support of the Black Lives Matter Movement. Participants were lied to when revealing the author of a specific article. The findings suggest that the black participants cared more about the Black Lives Matter Movement than the white participants by a significant margin.

Persuasion tactics conducted by Ideological Groups

Dunbar et al. studied on how violent and nonviolent ideological groups developed their persuasion strategy online. Ideological groups (or ethnic groups) are people who shared similar values such as religious beliefs, political beliefs, and social movements which distinguish them from out-group members. Some ideological groups are considered as violent because they acquiesce use of violence to achieve their values. For instance, the American Society for the Prevention of Cruelty to Animals' website advocated their ideas nonviolently, while ISIS website sanctioned and prioritized violent acts for their goals. Dunbar et al. have studied how nonviolent ideological groups and violent groups used tactics to induce central or peripheral processing, and surprisingly found that both nonviolent ideological and violent groups applied more central cues than peripheral cues in their persuasion, in another word, they adopted more arguments and evidence than simply designing a visually attractive website or idolizing someone. Besides, violent ideological groups used more fear appeals to their audience, and interacted less with their audience. Dunbar et al. speculated that some extreme groups desired to have tight control over their content so they had low tolerance for other's opinions.

=== In mental health counseling ===
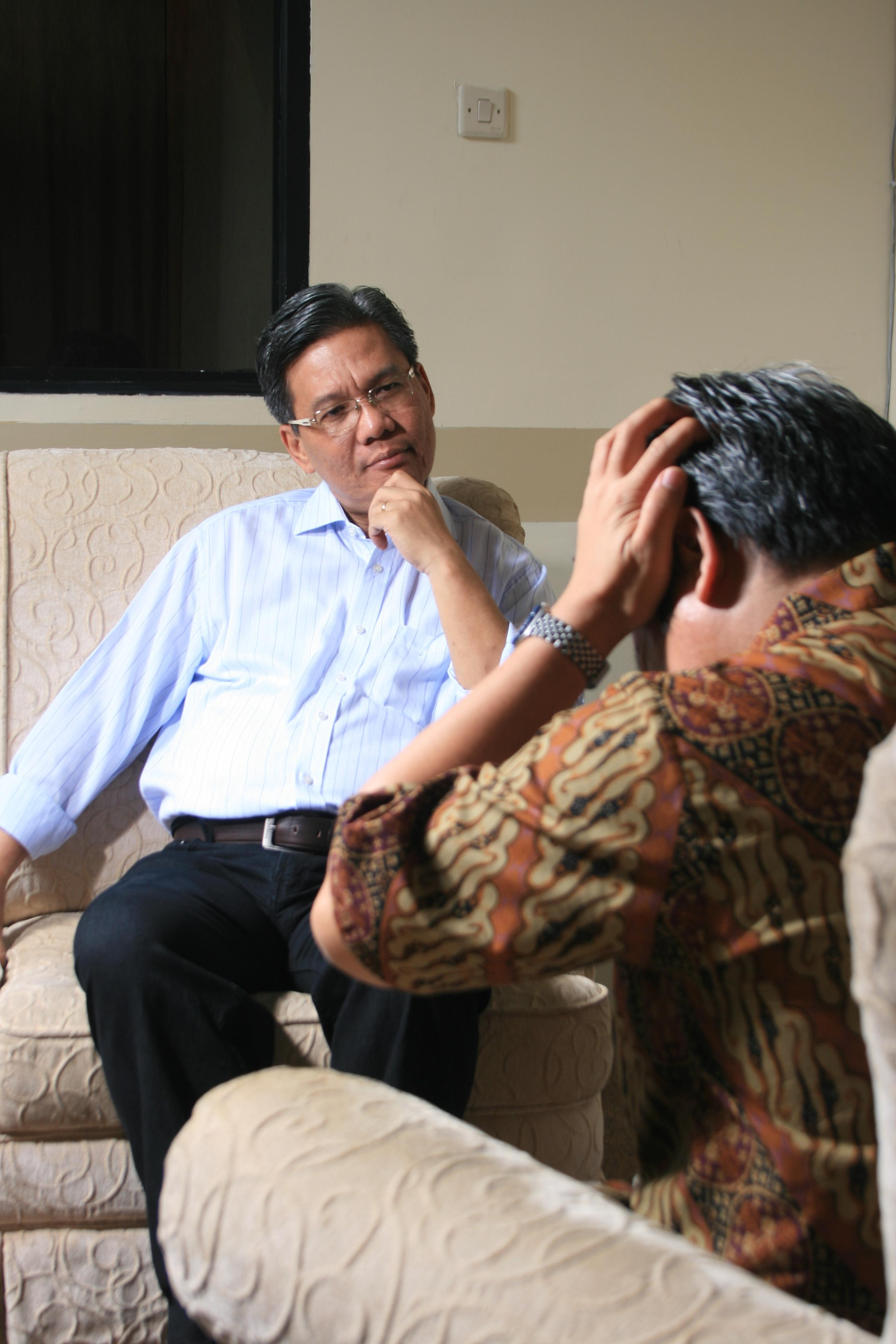
Mental health counseling

Counseling and stigma

One of the most common reasons why an individual does not attend counseling is because they are worried about the falling into a stigma (being considered crazy, or having serious "issues"). This stigma, which was prevalent 30 years ago, still exists today. Fortunately, an implementation of the ELM can help increase the positive perceptions of counseling amongst the undergraduate student population. Students that repeatedly watched a video that explained the function and positive outcomes of mental health counseling demonstrated a significant and lasting change in their perception to counseling. Students who watched the video once or not at all maintained a relatively negative view towards counseling. Thus, repeated exposure towards the positive elements of counseling lead towards a greater elaboration and implementation of the central route to combat negative social stigma of counseling. Most negative intuitions exist within the realm of the peripheral route, and therefore to work against stigmas the general public needs to engage their central route of processing.

Counselor credibility

The more credible a counselor is perceived to be, the more likely that counseling clients are to perceive the counselor's advice as impactful. However, counselor credibility is strongly mediated by the degree to which the client understands the information conveyed by the counselor. Therefore, it is extremely important that counseling clients feel that they understand their counselor. The use of metaphor is helpful for this. Metaphors require a deeper level of elaboration, thereby engaging the central route of processing. Kendall (2010) suggests using metaphor in counseling as a valid method towards helping clients understand the message/psychological knowledge conveyed by the client. When the client hears a metaphor that resonates with them, they are far more likely to trust and build positive rapport with the counselor.

There is a lot of digital health related content on the internet, in particular during the COVID-19 pandemic. There was a study conducted that examined how website designs and content influences users' attitudes and engagement with health information during the COVID-19 pandemic. The study suggests that if the site is easy to navigate and connects socially, it will be predicted to have positive effects, and argument quality does not appear to have a significant impact. Also, prior knowledge significantly boosts involvement. Issue involvement strongly predicts attitude. Designers of websites should prioritize ease of navigation on the websites as emotional and social cues are more persuasive than factual content here. Using strong peripheral cues can override weak arguments with positive feelings toward the ease of access to the information.

=== In Organizations ===
Li has expanded the theoretical frame of the ELM and applied it to information system acceptance. Li conducted a research on persuasive tactics for managers who needed to persuade staff to adopt new information systems within firms by integrating the ELM, social influence theory (It studies how a person is influenced by others in a network to conform to a community, and there are two types of social influences: informational and normative influences), and affective and cognition responses (or emotional responses and rational responses). Li's experiment suggested that: 1) managers should tailor their persuasive strategies according to various elaboration abilities of staff. For staff who have higher levels of elaboration likelihood, managers should emphasize benefits and values of new systems; For staff who have lower levels of elaboration likelihood, managers should provide expertise and credible sources; 2) Commonly speaking, providing strong arguments is more effective than relying on credibility; 3) Since normative influences lead to more affective responses and informational influences lead to more cognition responses, managers should implement different strategies to provoke staff's reaction, while 4) cognition responses are more important than affective responses when accepting a new system.

=== In Leadership Styles ===
^{At the Hawaii International Conference on System Sciences (HICSS) in January 2024, researchers Minsek Ko of Iowa State University, and Sumin Kim and Chinju Paul of Mississippi State University presented a study which used the ELM to bridge fear appeal literature with leadership literature.} ^{This study specifically targeted Information Security researchers. The goal of the study was to allow them to create messages to make people comply with security measures, especially those that use fear as a tactic. It shows the style of messages which change the perceptions of those who view the messages. This study aimed to interpret how the rhetoric of a message affects fear appeal. Using the ELM, they combined fear-based messaging research with leadership styles. Similar studies have also used fear appeal cues in communication to motivate security protection behaviors.} ^{Transactional leaders focus on surface-level details in security messages, while transformational leaders consider them more deeply. Fear-based messages work better for transactional leaders when appealing to emotions and credibility, while logical reasoning is more effective for transformational leaders.} ^{Other studies have shown similar results regarding leadership styles, stating peripheral cues to include positive mood have a positive effect on the target audience.}

== Methodological considerations ==
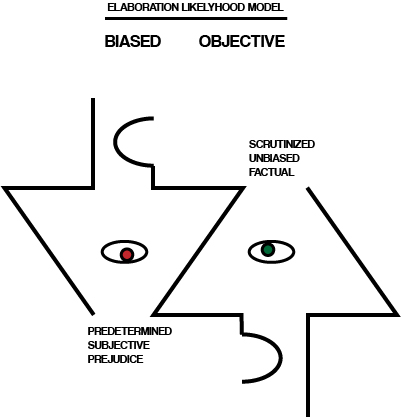

In designing a test for the aforementioned model, it is necessary to determine the quality of an argument, i.e., whether it is viewed as strong or weak. If the argument is not seen as strong, then the results of persuasion will be inconsistent. A strong argument is defined by Petty and Cacioppo as "one containing arguments such that when subjects are instructed to think about the message, the thoughts they generate are fundamentally favorable." An argument that is universally viewed as weak will elicit unfavorable results, especially if the subject considers it under high elaboration, thus being the central route. Test arguments must be rated by ease of understanding, complexity and familiarity. To study either route of the elaboration likelihood model, the arguments must be designed for consistent results. Also, when assessing persuasion of an argument, the influence of peripheral cues needs to be taken into consideration as cues can influence attitude even in the absence of argument processing. The extent or direction of message processing also needs to be taken into consideration when assessing persuasion, as variables can influence or bias thought by enabling or inhibiting the generation of a particular kind of thought in regard to the argument. "While the ELM theory continues to be widely cited and taught as one of the major cornerstones of persuasion, questions are raised concerning its relevance and validity in 21st century communication contexts."

== Misinterpretations of the theory ==
Some researchers have been criticized for misinterpreting the ELM. One such instance is Kruglanski and Thompson, who write that the processing of central or peripheral routes is determined by the type of information that affects message persuasion. For example, message variables are only influential when the central route is used and information like source variables is only influential when the peripheral route is used. In fact, the ELM does not make statements about types of information being related to routes. Rather, the key to the ELM is how any type of information will be used depending on central or peripheral routes, regardless of what that information is. For example, the central route may permit source variables to influence preference for certain language usage in the message (e.g. "beautiful") or validate a related product (e.g. cosmetics), while the peripheral route may only lead individuals to associate the "goodness" of source variables with the message. Theoretically, all of these could occur simultaneously. Thus, the distinction between central and peripheral routes is not the type of information being processed as those types can be applied to both routes, but rather how that information is processed and ultimately whether processing information in one way or the other will result in different attitudes.

A second instance of misinterpretation is that processing of the central route solely involves thinking about the message content and not thoughts about the issue. Petty and Cacioppo (1981) stated "If the issue is very important to the person, but the person doesn't understand the arguments being presented in the message, or if no arguments are actually presented, then elaboration of arguments cannot occur. ... Nevertheless, the person may still be able to think about the issue." Therefore, issue-relevant thinking is still a part of the central route and is necessary for one to think about the message content.

Lastly, a third instance of misinterpretation by Kruglanski and Thompson is the disregard for the quantitative dimension presented by the ELM and more focus on the qualitative dimension. This quantitative dimension is the peripheral route involves low-elaboration persuasion that is quantitatively different from the central route that involves high elaboration. With this difference the ELM also explains that low-elaboration persuasion processes are qualitatively different as well. It is seen as incorrect if the ELM focuses on a quantitative explanation over a qualitative one; however one of the ELM's key points is that elaboration can range from high to low which is not incorrect as data from experiments conducted by Petty (1997) as well as Petty and Wegener (1999) suggest that persuasion findings can be explained by a quantitative dimension without ever needing a qualitative one.

== Issues concerning the ELM ==
In 2014, J. Kitchen et al. scrutinized the literatures of the ELM for the past 30 years. They came up with four major research areas that have received most significant criticism:

=== Descriptive nature of the model ===
The first critique concerns issue of the model's initial development. Considering that the ELM was built upon previous empirical research and a diverse literature base to unify disparate ideas, the model is inherently descriptive because of the intuitive and conceptual assumptions underlying. For example, Choi and Salmon criticized Petty and Cacioppo's assumption that correct recall of a product led directly to high involvement. They proposed that high involvement is likely to be the result of other variations, for example the sample population; and the weak/strong arguments in one study are likely to result in different involvement characteristics in another study.

=== Role of emotions ===
In 2005, Morris, Woo and Singh asked why emotion was not considered in the cognitive processing described by ELM. The authors state the theory claims attitude change is mostly attained through cognitive (central) cues and not through affective (peripheral) cues. Morris, Wood and Singh claim that every message has an emotional aspect as well. They argue that those emotions play a bigger role in attitude change than which route is used to process the information.

=== Continuum questions ===
The elaboration likelihood continuum ought to show that a human can undergo a natural progression from high involvement to low involvement with the corresponding effects. This continuum can account for the swift between the central and the peripheral routes, but has yet been lack of comprehensive and empirical testing since the beginning. However, researches has been done under three distinct conditions: high, low, and moderate.

=== Multi-channel processing ===
This area of critique basically lands on the nature of ELM being a dual-process model, which indicates that the receivers will rely on one of the routes (central or peripheral) to process messages and possibly change attitude and behaviour. Stiff (1986) questioned the validity of ELM because the message should be able to be processed through two routes simultaneously. On top of Stiff's questioning, alternative models have been raised. Mackenzie et al (1986) advocated a dual mediation hypothesis (DMH) that allow receivers to process the ad's content and its execution at the same time with reasonable vigilance. Lord et al. (1995) proposed a combined influence hypothesis which argues that the central and peripheral cues worked in combination despite the variables of motivation and ability. Kruglanski et al. (1999) proposed a single cognitive process instead of the dual-process model. Although drawing on the fundamental conception from ELM, such as motivation, ability and continuum, the unimodel suggests a normative and heuristic rules for human to make judgement based on the evidence. The heuristic systematic model (HSM) is another alternative model concerning this issue.

In 2023, Hedhli and Zourrig compared ELM to the unimodel theory of persuasion. The authors set out to determine which of these competing models better explains how attitude change happens. They found that ELM is a more precise instrument and more accurately explains often inconsistent results in persuasion attempts. Hedhli and Zourrig say ELM cannot only explain persuasion but can also, in some cases, predict attitude change. Because of this the authors say ELM is a very useful tool for professionals in the marketing, advertising and communication fields.

=== Analysis of the different variables which mediate elaboration likelihood ===
Many studies have been expanding and refining the model by examining and testing the variables, particularly in advertising research. For example, Britner and Obermiller (1985) were among the first to expand the model to new variables under the peripheral processing. They proposed situation, person, and product categories as new variables under the context of marketing.

=== In AI Chatbots ===
Xiaoyi Zhang, Angelina Lilac Chen, Xinyang Piao, Manning Yu, Yakang Zhang, and Lihao Zhang say that they use the innovation of AI with the framework of ELM to determine how consumers intend to use the CAPS chatbots, especially in e-commerce. Gary C. Woodward and Robert E. Denton, Jr. who wrote "Persuasion and Influence in American Life" describe ELM saying, "We process information in different ways, depending on our levels interest the amount of time available". They did this by surveying 411 Chinese AI bot consumers to see the chatbot's reliability and accuracy, how much they trusted it, self-threat, and perceived dialogue intention to adopt. Using ELM they use the two ways of processing information which is central or peripheral to find whether they will open up to using AI chatbots or not. They want to see if people will adopt what the AI decisions are. Also to hopefully keep them coming back. They found that people trust AI chatbots more if they are willing to accept them. However, if they did not want to it would usually be because they felt self-threat with the accuracy and biases of the chatbots. They also found that the more accurate AI recommendations were they would trust the chatbot. Also the more positive the message the more positive effect, and the same for the other way around. Overall, their goal is to provide insights for e-commerce organizations to improve AI chatbot effectiveness, and for users to adopt it. Another study done by Ritik Raushan and Dr. Akansha Dubey on ELM and YouTube advertisement saw some similar results. Some of these results being that ELM in both of the studies ended up being mainly positive it just depended on what the specific ideas of the individual.

Research has investigated how AI can influence human behavior and the importance of trust in this relationship. A study by Cu Le et al. in Vietnam utilized a model focused on user perceptions and recognizable AI characteristics to analyze how trust in the AI chatbot influenced purchasing behavior. Findings indicate that central and peripheral route processing and trust in the AI chatbot were significant motivators of continued intention to use the chatbot for recommendations. Similarly, Rajesh Kumar Srivastava and Vijayashri Gurme found that central and peripheral cues in AI-driven interactions affect consumers' likelihood of adopting the chatbot's recommendation.

Researchers Srivastava and Gurme advanced the understanding of prior studies regarding people's receptiveness to AI virtual assistants. Data was collected from consumers aged 18-50 who were digitally active and familiar with AI-enabled platforms. Through a structured questionnaire, they found that respondents are growing more open to utilizing AI virtual assistants. Research showing that central and peripheral route processing, along with trust, play a significant role in the continued intention to use the chatbot for recommendations, and the growing likelihood to adopt the chatbot's recommendation, compounded with the results provided by Srivastava and Gurme, has sparked growing concerns about the implications of engaging with AI.

A study conducted in China by ZhengDong Hou explored the ramifications of AI utilization. Findings indicate how relying on AI-generated content reshapes human information processing. 90% of the comments were driven by emotional expression, using the peripheral processing route. Zhengdong concluded that AI content diminishes users' motivation to engage in central route processing, leading them to default to the peripheral route of persuasion processing. Research highlights the importance of examining peripheral route processing as AI becomes increasingly integrated into everyday life. Zhengdong Hou's research further addresses the potential effects of sustained interaction with AI agents.

== Relations to other theories ==
- Social judgment theory – emphasizes the distance in opinions, and whether it is in the "acceptance latitude" or "rejection latitude" or in the intermediate zone. This concept relates to the peripheral processing route because when a person already has a strong opinion on the idea (an anchor), they are more likely to take the peripheral route and not become involved in being persuaded.
- Social impact theory – emphasizes the number, strength, and immediacy of the people trying to influence a person to change their mind. If the number, strength, and immediacy of the people trying to influence a person are high, the person being persuaded is more likely to take the central processing route.
- Heuristic-systematic model – is very similar to the ELM because it is also a two-way model that explores how people gather and dissect persuasive messages.
- Extended transportation-imagery model

== See also ==
- Advertising – Form of communication for marketing
- Advertising management – Part of the advertising industry
- Attitude change – Theory of change of associated beliefs and behaviours
- Cognitive biases – Systematic pattern of deviation from norm or rationality in judgment
- Cognitive resources – Leadership theory in industrial and organizational psychology
- Consumer behaviour – Study of consumption of goods and services
- Countersignaling – Social behaviour related to finance
- Dual process theory – Psychological theory of how thought can arise in two different ways
- E-commerce – Type of business industry usually conducted over the internet
- Heuristic-systematic model of information processing – Dual-process theory of persuasion
- Integrated marketing communications – Marketing channels and tools used together
- Marketing – Study and process of exploring, creating, and delivering value to customers
- Marketing communications – Marketing channels and tools used together
- Motivation – Inner state causing goal-directed behavior
- Need for cognition – Psychology concept
- Online shopping – Form of electronic commerce
- Persuasion – Umbrella term of influence and mode of communication
- Positioning (marketing) – Mental perception of product or brand

=== Advertising models ===
- AIDA (Attention, Interest, Desire, Action) marketing model – In marketing, a type of hierarchy of effects model
- AISDALSLove (Attention, Interest, Search, Desire, Action, Like/dislike, Share, and Love/hate) marketing model – Hierarchy of effects model in advertising
- DAGMAR (Defining Advertising Goals for Measured Advertising Results) marketing model – Model for measuring advertising effectiveness
- Elaboration likelihood model and "positioning" – Mental perception of product or brand
