= Transportation theory =

Transportation theory may refer to:

- Transportation theory (mathematics)
- Transportation theory (psychology)
