= Narrativity =

Narrativity is the extent to which media tells a story, which is a storyteller's account of an event or a sequence of events leading to a transition from an initial state to a later state or outcome. There are four theoretical foundations of narrativity, represented by the notions of

1. narrative content,
2. narrative discourse,
3. narrative transportation, and
4. narrative persuasion.

Narrative content and discourse are the linguistic antecedents of narrativity. Narrative content reflects the linear sequence of events as characters live through them—that is, the backbone and structure describing who did what, where, when, and why. Narrative discourse represents how the story is told—that is, storytellers' use of literary devices to expand on the narrative content, such as emotional change over the course of the story line and sequencing of events to create drama. Narrative transportation is the engrossing, transformational experience of being swept away by a story. Narrative persuasion is the effect of narrative transportation, which manifests itself in story receivers' positive attitudes toward the story, story-consistent attitudes toward the experience described therein, and story-consistent intentions. The higher the quality of narrative content and discourse in a text, the greater its narrativity and its real-world implications, such as narrative transportation and persuasion, as van Laer, Escalas, Ludwig, and van den Hende show.

== The theory of narrativity ==
The extent to which story receivers experience narrative transportation and are "lost" in the narrative world depends on the level of narrativity of a text. Narratologists distinguish two components of narrativity: content and discourse. The difference between narrative content and narrative discourse is the difference between what is conveyed and how it is conveyed. The features of narrative content align with the structural components of a story (i.e., characters and events). Literary devices, which grant storytellers the power to frame the narrative, are associated with narrative discourse. Variations in these narrative elements affect transportation into the narrative and subsequent persuasion, as the theory of narrativity proposes.

== See also ==
- Media psychology
- Storytelling
