= Attitude change =

Theory of change of associated beliefs and behaviours

Attitude change is when a person or group changes their views, values, or beliefs about a particular topic, issue, or object. This can happen as a result of new information, experiences, or influence from others. Attitudes are associated beliefs and behaviors towards some object. They are not stable, and because of the communication and behavior of other people, are subject to change by social influences, as well as by the individual's motivation to maintain cognitive consistency when cognitive dissonance occurs—when two attitudes or attitude and behavior conflict. Attitudes and attitude objects are functions of affective and cognitive components. It has been suggested that the inter-structural composition of an associative network can be altered by the activation of a single node. Thus, by activating an affective or emotional node, attitude change may be possible, though affective and cognitive components tend to be intertwined.

== Bases ==
There are three bases for attitude change: compliance, identification, and internalization. These three processes represent the different levels of attitude change in response to accepting influence.

=== Compliance ===
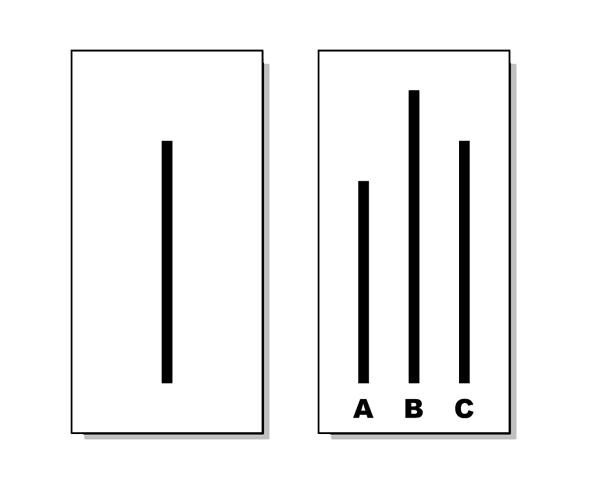
One of the pairs of cards used in the experiment. The card on the left has the reference line and the one on the right shows the three comparison lines.

Compliance refers to a change in behavior based on consequences, such as an individual's hopes to gain rewards or avoid punishment from another group or person. The individual does not necessarily experience changes in beliefs or evaluations of an attitude object, but rather is influenced by the social outcomes of adopting a change in behavior. For example, a child might outwardly agree with their parents' political party to avoid conflict or gain approval, even though they don't personally agree with or understand the party's values or policies. The individual is also often aware that he or she is being urged to respond in a certain way.

Compliance was demonstrated through a series of laboratory experiments known as the Asch experiments. Experiments led by Solomon Asch of Swarthmore College asked groups of students to participate in a "vision test". In reality, all but one of the participants were confederates of the experimenter, and the study was really about how the remaining student would react to the confederates' behavior. Participants were asked to pick, out of three line options, the line that is the same length as a sample and were asked to give the answer out loud. Unbeknown to the participants, Asch had placed a number of confederates to deliberately give the wrong answer before the participant. The results showed that 75% of responses were in line with majority influence and were the same answers the confederates picked. Variations in the experiments showed that compliance rates increased as the number of confederates increased, and the plateau was reached with around 15 confederates. The likelihood of compliance dropped with minority opposition, even if only one confederate gave the correct answer. The basis for compliance is founded on the fundamental idea that people want to be accurate and right.

=== Identification ===
Identification explains one's change of beliefs and affect in order to be similar to someone one admires or likes. In this case, the individual adopts the new attitude, not due to the specific content of the attitude object, but because it is associated with the desired relationship. Identification also reflects a need to establish or maintain a meaningful, self-defining connection with another person or group, often by taking on their role or forming a reciprocal relationship. For example, children's attitudes on their political party affiliations are often adopted from their parents' attitudes and beliefs, not because the children have critically evaluated these ideas, but because doing so strengthens their bond with their parents and aligns with their identity within the family.

=== Internalization ===
Internalization refers to the change in beliefs and affect when one finds the content of the attitude to be intrinsically rewarding, and thus leads to actual change in beliefs or evaluations of an attitude object. The new attitude or behaviour is consistent with the individual's value system, and tends to be merged with the individual's existing values and beliefs. Internalization occurs when the adopted behaviour aligns with the individual's value and fulfills their personal needs, making it deeply integrated into their value system. Using the same example, a child may grow up aligning with their parents' political party because over time, they come to genuinely agree with the party's values and policies, finding them consistent with their own developing belief system.

The expectancy-value theory is based on internalization of attitude change. This model states that the behaviour towards some object is a function of an individual's intent, which is a function of one's overall attitude towards the action. These attitudes are influenced by two key factors: the individual's expectation of success (how likely they believe they are to achieve the desired outcome) and the value they place on the outcome (how important or beneficial they perceive it to be). Together, these components explain how attitudes and motivations drive behaviour.

== Emotion-based ==
Emotion plays a major role in persuasion, social influence, and attitude change. Much of attitude research has emphasised the importance of affective or emotion components. Emotion works hand-in-hand with the cognitive process, or the way we think, about an issue or situation. Emotional appeals are commonly found in advertising, health campaigns and political messages. Recent examples include no-smoking health campaigns (see tobacco advertising) and political campaigns emphasizing the fear of terrorism. Attitude change based on emotions can be seen vividly in serial killers who are faced with major stress. There is considerable empirical support for the idea that emotions in the form of fear arousal, empathy, or a positive mood can enhance attitude change under certain conditions.

Important factors that influence the impact of emotional appeals include self-efficacy, attitude accessibility, issue involvement, and message/source features. Attitudes that are central to one's being are highly resistant to change while others that are less fixed may change with new experiences or information. A new attitude (e.g. to time-keeping or absenteeism or quality) may challenge existing beliefs or norms so creating a feeling of psychological discomfort known as cognitive dissonance. It is difficult to measure attitude change since attitudes may only be inferred and there might be significant divergence between those publicly declared and privately held. Self-efficacy is a perception of one's own human agency; in other words, it is the perception of our own ability to deal with a situation. It is an important variable in emotional appeal messages because it dictates a person's ability to deal with both the emotion and the situation. For example, if a person is not self-efficacious about their ability to impact the global environment, they are not likely to change their attitude or behaviour about global warming.

Affective forecasting, otherwise known as intuition or the prediction of emotion, also impacts attitude change. Research suggests that predicting emotions is an important component of decision making, in addition to the cognitive processes. How we feel about an outcome may override purely cognitive rationales. In terms of research methodology, the challenge for researchers is measuring emotion and subsequent impacts on attitude. Since we cannot see into the brain, various models and measurement tools have been constructed to obtain emotion and attitude information. Measures may include the use of physiological cues like facial expressions, vocal changes, and other body rate measures. For instance, fear is associated with raised eyebrows, increased heart rate and increased body tension. Other methods include concept or network mapping, and using primes or word cues.

== Dual models: depth of processing ==
Dual process models refer to theories that describe how people can process information quickly and automatically or slow and deliberately. Many dual process models are used to explain the affective (emotional) and cognitive processing and interpretations of messages, as well as the different depths of attitude change. These include the heuristic-systematic model of information processing and the elaboration likelihood model.

=== Heuristic-systematic model of information processing ===
The heuristic-systematic model of information processing describes two depths in the processing of attitude change, systematic processing and heuristic processing. In this model information is either processed in a high-involvement and high-effort systematic way, or information is processed through shortcuts known as heuristics. For example, emotions are affect-based heuristics, in which feelings and gut-feeling reactions are often used as shortcuts.

==== Systematic processing ====
Systematic processing occurs when individuals are motivated and have high cognition to process a message. Individuals using systematic processing are motivated to pay attention and have the cognitive ability to think deeply about a message; they are persuaded by the content of the message, such as the strength or logic of the argument. Motivation can be determined by many factors, such as how personally relevant the topic is, and cognitive ability can be determined by how knowledgeable an individual is on the message topic, or whether or not there is a distraction in the room. Individuals who receive a message through systematic processing usually internalize the message, resulting in a longer and more stable attitude change.

According to the heuristic-systematic model of information processing, people are motivated to use systematic processing when they want to achieve a "desired level of confidence" in their judgments. There are factors that have been found to increase the use of systematic processing; these factors are associated with either decreasing an individual's actual confidence or increasing an individual's perceived confidence. These factors may include framing persuasive messages in an unexpected manner; self-relevancy of the message.

Systematic processing has been shown to be beneficial in social influence settings. Systematic reasoning has been shown to be successful in producing more valid solutions during group discussions and greater solution accuracy. Shestowsky's (1998) research in dyad discussions revealed that the individual in the dyad who had high motivation and high need in cognition had the greater impact on group decisions. However, a limitation of systemic processing is that it may not capture the full complexity of how emotional states interact with different memory systems and processing types. By focusing on specific tasks or processing methods, it may overlook other factors, such as individual differences in how emotions influence memory encoding or attention. A solution is to use a broader approach that combines different memory tasks, emotional states, and individual differences to better understand how emotions affect memory.

==== Heuristic processing ====
Heuristic processing occurs when individuals have low motivation and/or low cognitive ability to process a message. Instead of focusing on the argument of the message, recipients using heuristic processing focus on more readily accessible information and other unrelated cues, such as the authority or attractiveness of the speaker. Individuals who process a message through heuristic processing do not internalize the message, and thus any attitude change resulting from the persuasive message is temporary and unstable.

For example, people are more likely to grant favors if reasons are provided. A study shows that when people said, "Excuse me, I have five pages to xerox. May I use the copier?" they received a positive response of 60%. The statement, "Excuse me, I have five pages to xerox. I am in a rush. May I use the copier?" produced a 95% success rate.

Heuristic processing examples include social proof, reciprocity, authority, and liking.

- Social proof is the means by which we utilize other people's behaviors in order to form our own beliefs. Our attitudes toward following the majority change when a situation appears uncertain or ambiguous to us, when the source is an expert, or when the source is similar to us. In a study conducted by Sherif, he discovered the power of crowds when he worked with experimenters who looked up in the middle of New York City. As the number of the precipitating group increased, the percentage of passers-by who looked up increased as well.
- Reciprocity compels people to repay favors, the behavior is motivated by an unconscious sense of obligation. We are most likely to reciprocate when the original favor was unrequested and made out of kindness, suggesting a positive attitude towards the other party. In Regan’s study on reciprocity, participants were twice as likely to purchase raffle tickets from a confederate when the confederate had earlier given them an unsolicited soda. The fundamentals of reciprocity can be seen in persuasion tactics such as the foot-in-the-door technique (small requests followed by larger requests), and its opposite, the door-in-the-face technique (large requests followed by more minor requests).
- Authority plays a role in attitude change in situations where there are superior-inferior relationships. We are more likely to become obedient to authorities when the authority's expertise is perceived as high and when we anticipate receiving rewards. A famous study that constitutes the difference in attitude change is the Milgram experiment, where people changed their attitude to "shocking their partner" more when they followed authorities whereas the subjects themselves would have not done so otherwise.
- Liking has shown that if one likes another party, one is more inclined to carry out a favor. The attitude changes are based on whether an individual likes an idea or person, and if he or she does not like the other party, he/she may not carry out the favor or do so out of obligation. Liking can influence one's opinions through factors such as physical attractiveness, similarities, compliments, contact and cooperation.

=== Elaboration likelihood model ===
The elaboration likelihood model is similar in concept to and shares many ideas with other dual processing models, such as the heuristic-systematic model of information processing. In the elaboration likelihood model, cognitive processing is the central route and affective/emotion processing is often associated with the peripheral route. The central route pertains to an elaborate cognitive processing of information while the peripheral route relies on cues or feelings. The ELM suggests that true attitude change only happens through the central processing route that incorporates both cognitive and affective components as opposed to the more heuristics-based peripheral route. This suggests that motivation through emotion alone will not result in an attitude change.

== Cognitive dissonance theory ==
Cognitive dissonance, a theory originally developed by Festinger (1957), is the idea that people experience psychological discomfort when two linked cognitions are inconsistent, such as when there are two conflicting attitudes about a topic, or inconsistencies between one's attitude and behavior on a certain topic. The basic idea of the Cognitive Dissonance Theory relating to attitude change, is that people are motivated to reduce dissonance which can be achieved through changing their attitudes and beliefs. Cooper & Fazio's (1984) have also added that cognitive dissonance does not arise from any simple cognitive inconsistency, but rather results from freely chosen behavior that may bring about negative consequences. These negative consequences may be threats to the consistency, stability, predictability, competence, moral goodness of the self-concept, or violation of general self-integrity. More recent research has expanded on this by investigating the neural basis of dissonance, showing that dissonance reduction is linked to activity in the anterior cingulate cortex and prefrontal cortex, which regulate conflict and self-regulation.

Research has suggested multiple routes that cognitive dissonance can be reduced. One widely studied strategy is self-affirmation, which involves focusing on positive aspects of the self to protect one’s self-integrity when faced with threatening information. While effective in some contexts, studies suggest that when multiple dissonance-reduction strategies are available, individuals often prefer to directly alter their attitudes or behaviours rather than engage in self-affirmation. Interestingly, individuals with high self-esteem, who theoretically have more internal resources for self-affirmation, also tend to favour modifying their cognitions over relying on affirming self-worth.

A simple example of cognitive dissonance resulting in attitude change is that of a heavy smoker who learns that a loved one died of lung cancer due to smoking. This individual experiences conflicting cognitions: the desire to smoke, and the knowledge that smoking could lead to death and a desire not to die. In order to reduce dissonance, this smoker may choose to stop smoking (behavior change), acknowledge the risks (attitude change), or rationalize the behavior (e.g., “I exercise regularly, so it won't affect me”)This example illustrates how people often adjust their attitudes, beliefs, or behaviors to restore internal consistency.

=== Cultural Influences on Cognitive Dissonance Reduction ===
Recent studies have also highlighted how cultural and social contexts influence dissonance reduction. One study compared levels of cognitive dissonance reduction in a free choice paradigm between two cultural contexts (Canada with an independent self-construal and Japan with an interdependent self-construal). The study found that Canadian participants showed significant cognitive dissonance reduction with results nearly identical to those of past self-affirmation studies of American participants. Japanese participants, on the other hand, showed no reduction in cognitive dissonance. Thus, in interdependent cultures, an individual's self-worth is more dependent on relationships with others than on internal consistency, and therefore does not need to be reduced to maintain self-affirmation through dissonance reduction.

However, in collectivist cultures (e.g., Japan, China), where social cohesion and relationships are prioritized, decreases in dissonance are more likely to occur when it comes to making decisions about close others rather than for oneself. For example, Japanese participants showed signs of dissonance when considering meaningful friend preferences, whereas Americans showed dissonance regardless of relationship context. Similarly, research has found that Asian Canadians and Japanese experience stronger dissonance when they worry about making bad choices for others, whereas Americans show the opposite pattern-experiencing dissonance when making decisions for themselves rather than being close to others.

== Sorts of studies ==
The study of attitude change has deep historical roots in the field of social psychology, beginning in particular with the World War II-era research of Carl Hovland and his team. Their work at Yale provided an important theoretical framework for exploring how message characteristics, such as the credibility of the source and emotional contagion, influence persuasion effectiveness.

- High-credibility sources lead to more attitude change immediately following the communication act. However, later effects—known as the sleeper effect—suggest that individuals may eventually forget the source of a message, which can allow low-credibility messages to influence attitudes over time.
- Hovland's research also involved the exploration of fear appeals, and the results showed that mild fear appeals lead to more attitude change than strong fear appeals, which may cause people to resist or outright reject the message. Propagandists had often used fear appeals. Hoveland's evidence about the effect of such appeals suggested that a source should be cautious in using fear appeals.

=== Belief rationalization ===
The process of how people change their own attitudes has been studied for years. Belief rationalization has been recognized as an important aspect to understand this process. Belief rationalization is the cognitive process by which an individual adjusts his or her attitudes to conform to past behavior, especially when the behavior conflicts with the belief. For example, when people who value their health smoke, they may subsequently downplay the health risks to rationalize their behavior. The stability of people's past attitudes can be influenced if they hold beliefs that are inconsistent with their own behaviors. The influence of past behavior on current attitudes is stable when little information conflicts with the behavior. Alternatively, people's attitudes may lean more radically toward the prior behavior if the conflict makes it difficult to ignore, and forces them to rationalize their past behavior.

Attitudes are often restructured at the time people are asked to report them. As a result, inconsistencies between the information that enters into the reconstruction and the original attitudes can produce changes in prior attitudes, whereas consistency between these elements often elicits stability in prior attitudes. Individuals need to resolve the conflict between their own behaviors and the subsequent beliefs. However, people usually align themselves with their attitudes and beliefs instead of their behaviors. More importantly, this process of resolving people's cognitive conflicts that emerges cuts across both self-perception and dissonance even when the associated effect may only be strong in changing prior attitudes

=== Comparative processing ===
Human judgment is comparative in nature. Comparative processing refers to the tendency for human judgment to be shaped by comparisons between new and existing information. Departing from identifying people's need to justify their own beliefs in the context of their own behaviors, psychologists also believe that people have the need to carefully evaluate new messages on the basis of whether these messages support or contradict with prior messages, regardless of whether they can recall the prior messages after they reach a conclusion. This comparative processing mechanism is built on "information-integration theory" and "social judgement theory". Both of these theories have served to model people's attitude change in judging the new information while they have not adequately explained the influential factors that motivate people to integrate the information.

More recent research in persuasion has shifted focus toward how people compare different sets of information on a single topic. As previous research demonstrated, analyzing information on one target product may trigger less impact of comparative information than comparing this product with the same product under competing brands.

When people compare different sets of information on one single issue or object, the effect of people's effort to compare new information with prior information seemed to correlate with the perceived strength of the new, strong information when considered jointly with the initial information. Comparison processes can be enhanced when prior evaluations, associated information, or both are accessible. People will simply construct a current judgment based on the new information or adjust the prior judgment when they are not able to retrieve the information from prior messages. The impact this comparative process can have on people's attitude change is mediated by changes in the strength of new information perceived by receivers. These findings above have wide range of applications in social marketing, political communication, and health promotion. For example, designing an advertisement that is counteractive against an existing attitude towards a behavior or policy is perhaps most effective if the advertisement uses the same format, characters, or music of ads associated with the initial attitudes.

== See also ==
- Attitudinal fix
- Fear appeals
- Reactance (psychology)
- Yale attitude change approach
