= Heuristic-systematic model of information processing =

Dual-process theory of persuasion

The heuristic-systematic model of information processing (HSM) is a widely recognized model by Shelly Chaiken that attempts to explain how people receive and process persuasive messages.

The model states that individuals can process messages in one of two ways: heuristically or systematically. Systematic processing entails careful and deliberative processing of a message, while heuristic processing entails the use of simplifying decision rules or 'heuristics' to quickly assess the message content. The guiding belief with this model is that individuals are more apt to minimize their use of cognitive resources (i.e., to rely on heuristics), thus affecting the intake and processing of messages.

HSM predicts that processing type will influence the extent to which a person is persuaded or exhibits lasting attitude change. HSM is quite similar to the elaboration likelihood model, or ELM. Both models were predominantly developed in the early- to mid-1980s and share many of the same concepts and ideas.

== History ==
Early research investigating how people process persuasive messaging focused mainly on cognitive theories and the way the mind processed each element of a message. One of the early guiding principles of underlying motivations of persuasive communications came from Leon Festinger's (1950) statement that incorrect or improper attitudes are generally maladaptive and can have deleterious behavioral and affective consequences.

In 1953, Hovland, Janis, and Kelley noted that a sense of "rightness" accompanies holding opinions similar to the opinions of others. In 1987, Holtz and Miller reaffirmed this line of thought by noting, "When other people are perceived to hold similar attitudes, one's confidence in the validity of one's own attitude is increased."

Another concept that contributed to the HSM was the sufficiency principle. This principle reflected widespread notions that people use limited cognitive resources, or use an "economy-minded" approach to information processing when presented with persuasive information. Based on this thought, early assumptions said people were at least partially guided by the "principle of least effort". This principle stated that in the interest of economy, the mind would often process with the least amount of effort (i.e., use a heuristic), and for more detailed information processing would use more effortful (systematic) processing. This was the major difference when compared with the ELM, which described the two different ways information was processed, through central and/or peripheral processing.

The developer and main researcher of the HSM was Shelly Chaiken. Under her direction, the HSM has undergone several major revisions. As she noted in 1980 and 1987, the model specified the two modes of heuristic and systematic processing. Then, Chaiken et al. noted in 1989 that the model was extended to specify the psychological conditions for triggering the modes of processing in terms of the discrepancy between actual and desired subjective confidence. In 1986, Chaiken, and others, updated the model to include underlying motivations.

== Heuristic processing ==
Heuristic processing uses judgmental rules known as knowledge structures that are learned and stored in memory. The heuristic approach offers an economic advantage by requiring minimal cognitive effort on the part of the recipient. Heuristic processing is related to the concept of "satisficing."

Heuristic processing is governed by availability, accessibility, and applicability. Availability refers to the knowledge structure, or heuristic, being stored in memory for future use. Accessibility of the heuristic applies to the ability to retrieve the memory for use. Applicability of the heuristic refers to the relevancy of the memory to the judgmental task. Due to the use of knowledge structures, a person using heuristic information processing is likely to agree with messages delivered by experts, or messages that are endorsed by others, without fully processing the semantic content of the message. In comparison to systematic processing, heuristic processing entails judging the validity of messages by relying more on accessible context information, such as the identity of the source or other non-content cues. Thus, heuristic views de-emphasize detailed information evaluation and focus on the role of simple rules or cognitive heuristics in mediating persuasion.

Individuals may be more likely to use heuristic processing when an issue is less personally important to them (they have low "issue involvement") or when they believe their judgment will not have significant impacts on themselves (low "response involvement").

== Systematic processing ==
Systematic processing involves comprehensive and analytic, cognitive processing of judgment-relevant information. The systematic approach values source reliability and message content, which may exert stronger impact on persuasion, when determining message validity. Judgments developed from systematic processing rely heavily on in-depth treatment of judgment-relevant information and respond accordingly to the semantic content of the message. Recipients developing attitudes from a systematic basis exert considerable cognitive effort and actively attempt to comprehend and evaluate the message's arguments. When processing systematically, recipients also attempt to assess their validity as it relates to the message's conclusion. Systematic views of persuasion emphasize detailed processing of message content and the role of message-based cognitions in mediating opinion change. While recipients utilizing systematic processing rely heavily on message content, source characteristics and other non-content may supplement the recipients' assessment of validity in the persuasive message.

== Choosing systematic or heuristic processing ==
Both heuristic and systematic processes may occur independently. It is also possible for both to occur simultaneously in an additive fashion or in a way that the judgmental implications of one process lend a bias nature to the other. The heuristic-systematic model includes the hypothesis that attitudes developed or changed by utilizing heuristic processing alone will likely be less stable, less resistant to counterarguments, and will be less predictive of subsequent behavior than attitudes developed or changed utilizing systematic processing.

Message recipients using heuristic processing may sometimes choose to accept message conclusions they would otherwise have rejected, or vice versa, had they invested more time and effort to scrutinize the message.

Source credibility affects persuasion under conditions of low, but not high, issue-involvement and response-involvement.

When economic concerns are predominant, the recipient will likely use heuristic processing to form a judgement about the persuasive argument. Conversely, when reliability concerns are predominant (i.e., recipients perceive significant importance in accurately judging an argument), they will likely use a systematic processing strategy. Reliability concerns are influenced by the level of the recipient's issue-involvement or response-involvement. When the recipient views their judgment as being less consequential, they will likely place greater value on economic concerns than reliability concerns.

== Practical application ==
Research into information processing, especially in persuasive messaging, can be applied in advertising. For instance, HSM has been used in Internet webpage considerations.

In a 2002 study by Wathen & Burkell, they proposed a theory that separated the evaluation process into distinct segments. In the theory, the process began with low-effort examinations of peripheral cues (e.g., appearance, design, organization, and source reputation) then continued to a more high-effort analysis of the content of the information source. The proposed research also drew on social psychological theories of dual-processing, which stated that information processing outcomes were the result of interaction between a fast, associative information-processing mode based on low-effort heuristics, and a slow, rule-based information processing mode based on high-effort systematic reasoning. Wathen and Burkell proposed (but did not test) that if an individual determines that an online source does not meet an appropriate level of credibility at any one stage, then he or she will leave the site without further evaluation. They theorized that this "easy to discard" behavior was indicative of information-rich environments, where the assumption is that many other potential sources of information exist, and spending too much time on any one source is potentially wasteful.

The HSM has also been applied in medical decision-making contexts. A 2004 study by Suzanne K. Steginga, PhD, and Stefano Occhipinti, PhD, Queensland Cancer Fund and the School of Applied Psychology at Griffith University investigated the utility of the heuristic-systematic processing model as a framework for the investigation of patient decision making. A total of 111 men diagnosed with localized prostate cancer were assessed using verbal protocol analysis and self-report measures. The results showed: "Most men (68%) preferred that decision making be shared equally between them and their doctor. Men's use of the expert opinion heuristic was related to men's verbal reports of decisional uncertainty and having a positive orientation to their doctor and medical care; a desire for greater involvement in decision making was predicted by a high internal locus of health control. Trends were observed for systematic information processing to increase when the heuristic strategy used was negatively affect-laden and when men were uncertain about the probabilities for cure and side effects. There was a trend for decreased systematic processing when the expert opinion heuristic was used. Findings were consistent with the heuristic-systematic processing model and suggest that this model has utility for future research in applied decision making about health issues.

== Direction of research ==
Originally the heuristic-systematic model was developed to apply to "validity seeking" persuasion contexts in which peoples' primary motivation is to attain accurate attitudes that align with relevant facts. Chaiken originally assumed that the primary processing goal of accuracy-motivated recipients is to assess the validity of persuasive messages, and that both heuristic and systematic processing can serve this objective. Other motives beyond the validity-seeking persuasion context were later identified by Chaiken and colleagues (1989) who proposed an expanded model that posits two additional motives that heuristic and systematic processing can serve: defense-motivation, the desire to form or defend particular attitudinal positions, and impression-motivation, the desire to form or hold socially acceptable attitudinal positions.

Contrary to previous viewpoints, the heuristic-systematic model and the elaboration likelihood model is treated as complementary models to create a dual-processing framework for use in research for understanding a variety of social influence phenomena.

== Criticisms ==
A major criticism of HSM is that the model closely relates to ELM, which is also a dual-processing model discussing two main paths to persuasion. The ELM discusses the two routes as "central" route processing and "peripheral" route processing. ELM's central processing has been likened to systematic processing in HSM, while peripheral processing is similar to HSM's heuristic processing. These two routes of processing define related theories behind attitude change.

In ELM, the central route is reflective and requires a willingness to process and think about the message. The peripheral route occurs when attitudes are formed without extensive thought, but more from mental shortcuts, credibility, and appearance cues. The route of persuasion processing depends on the level of involvement in the topic or issue. High involvement or elaboration increases central route processing especially when motivation and ability in the message exists. Therefore, low involvement increases peripheral route processing when motivation and ability conditions of persuasion do not exist. However, if the topic or idea is irrelevant to the individual, then the message takes the peripheral route.

HSM specifically examines validity seeking persuasion settings concerning people's motivations within the social environment. The limitation of HSM exists in the inability to define the specific motivations of persuasion, which is why Chaiken expanded HSM to illustrate that heuristic and systematic processing can "serve defense-motivation, the desire to form or defend particular attitudinal positions, and impression- motivation, the desire to form or hold socially acceptable attitudinal positions" (p. 326).

Major assumptions exist with both HSM and ELM, which is why both models have generated debate and are often misconstrued. Systematic processing assumes that persuasion has occurred via the recipient's understanding and cognitive elaboration of the persuasive argument. In addition, researchers hypothesize that systematic processing requires and uses cognitive capacity, while heuristic processing makes low cognitive demands. Furthermore, both HSM and ELM assume that "capacity and motivation are important determinants of systematic process" which results in biased modes of processing (p. 327). With heuristic processing, there is less need to process information and cognitively in comparison to systematic processing. Heuristic processing occurs when people simply form immediate decisions and conclusions based on the information available versus analytical processing of information given that obviously requires more cognition. Heuristic processing as defined by HSM, illustrates that people can formulate decisions utilizing basic rules such as "experts' statements can be trusted" and "consensus implies correctness" to establish validity within messages (p. 327). Therefore, individuals who process messages through heuristic processing routes of persuasion, likely formulate decisions based on experts' opinion and what the consensus believes opposed to fully processing the message in its entirety.

This leads to another similarity between HSM and ELM, as attitudes and opinions developed through heuristic processing will tend to be "less stable, less resistant to counter-propaganda, and less predictive of behavior" in comparison to attitudes and opinions formed through detailed information within systematic processing (p. 327).

HSM postulates that heuristic and systematic processing can each influence both "independent" and "interdependent" effects on decision making by occurring simultaneously (p. 328). Unlike HSM, ELM does not postulate whether central route processing and peripheral route processing can co-occur or not. Another assumption by Chaiken and her colleagues is that systematic processing does in fact provide people with more judgment relevant information in comparison to heuristic processing of information, which does not account for any weaknesses in expert subject matter material. Therefore, while systematic processing may be prevalent within many social environments, HSM, unlike its model counterpart ELM, does illustrate "the possibility that heuristic processing can exert a significant and independent influence on persuasion" (p 329).

== See also ==
- Attitude change – Theory of change of associated beliefs and behaviours
- Bounded rationality – Making of satisfactory, not optimal, decisions
- Cognitive-experiential self-theory (CEST) – Dual-process model of perception
- Dual process theory – Psychological theory of how thought can arise in two different ways
- Dual process theory (moral psychology) – Theory of human moral judgment
- Elaboration likelihood model – Dual process theory of persuasion
- Extended parallel process model – How individuals react to fear-inducing messages
- Extended transportation-imagery model – Psychological theory
- Heuristic (psychology) – Simple strategies or mental processes involved in making quick decisions
- Information processing (psychology) – Approach to understanding human thinking
- Need for cognition – Psychology concept
- Persuasion – Umbrella term of influence and mode of communication
