= Shelly Chaiken =

American social psychologist

- Born: Rochelle Lynne Chaiken; 1949 (age 76–77)
- Education: University of Massachusetts Amherst
- Scientific career
- Fields: Social psychology
- Thesis: The use of source versus message cues in persuasion (1977)
- Doctoral advisor: Alice Eagly

Rochelle Lynne "Shelly" Chaiken (born 1949) is an American social psychologist. She first received her BS from the University of Maryland, College Park in 1971 for mathematics. She later earned her MS (in 1975) and her PhD (in 1978) at the University of Massachusetts Amherst in social psychology. She was a professor of psychology at New York University, but is now retired.

Chaiken is a member of many psychological organizations including the Society of Experimental Social Psychology, the American Psychological Association (Fellow, Div. 8), and the American Psychological Society.

== Research ==
She completed work involving attitude, persuasion, and social cognition and is most well-known for the developing the heuristic-systematic model of information processing. Chaiken completed a study researching interracial contact. The study found that participant who were exposed to more white faces in a positive way, had a more negative view or increased prejudice toward black faces. Chaiken edited many psychological books including Attitude Research in the 21st Century: The Current State of Knowledge, and Dual-Process Theories in Social Psychology. Dual-Process Theories in Social Psychology conglomerates the theories of informational processing in an organized way, along with reviews and research of these theories. Much of her work involving persuasion has been helpful to conflict resolution centers and negotiations with their patients.

For her work on dual process theories of attitudes, on October 17, 2009 Chaiken was a co-recipient of the Society of Experimental Social Psychology's Scientific Impact Award, which "[h]onors the author(s) of a specific article or chapter that has proven highly influential over the last 25 years."
