= Richard E. Petty =

Distinguished University Professor of Psychology at The Ohio State University

Academic work
- Institutions: Ohio State University

Richard E. Petty is Distinguished University Professor of psychology at Ohio State University.

Petty received his Ph.D. in social psychology from Ohio State in 1977. After graduation, he went on to start his academic career as the assistant professor of psychology at the University of Missouri, and in 1985 he was named the Frederick A. Middlebush Professor of Psychology. In 1987 he returned to Ohio State University for an appointment as a professor of psychology and director of the Social Psychology Doctoral Program and has been a distinguished university professor since 1998. He served as chair of the Psychology Department from 1998 to 2002 and again from 2008 to 2015.

Petty’s research focuses on the situational and individual differences factors responsible for changes in beliefs, attitudes, judgments, decisions, and behaviors. More specifically, his current work examines the Elaboration Likelihood Model of persuasion. This model is used to understand prejudice, consumer choice, political and legal decisions, and health behaviors.

He has been a consultant and panelist for the National Academy of Sciences Committee on Dietary Guidelines Implementation to Improve the Health of Americans and the Committee for a Social Psychology of Aging, the National Institute on Drug Abuse panel on Using Persuasive Communication to Prevent Drug Abuse, and the National Science Foundation panel on the Human Dimensions of Global Change.

== Awards and honors ==
In 1999, he was named as distinguished scientist-lecturer for the American Psychological Association. In 2000 Petty received the award for Distinguished Scientific Contributions to Consumer Psychology from the Society for Consumer Psychology. In 2000 he received the Donald T. Campbell Award for Distinguished Scientific Contributions to Social Psychology from the Society for Personality and Social Psychology. In 2015 he received the Distinguished Scientific Contribution award from the Society of Experimental Social Psychology, and in 2024 he received the Distinguished Scientific Contribution award from the American Psychological Association. Petty is a fellow in the American Association for the Advancement of Science, the American Psychological Association, the Association for Psychological Science, the American Academy of Arts and Sciences, and was most recently elected to the National Academy of Sciences.

Petty served as editor of the SPSP journal, Personality and Social Psychology Bulletin, and as associate editor for the APA journal, Emotion, and on the editorial boards of the Journal of Personality and Social Psychology, the Journal of Experimental Social Psychology, the Personality and Social Psychology Review, the Journal of Consumer Psychology, and Media Psychology. In 2002 Petty served as president of the Midwestern Psychological Association and in 2009 he served as president of the Society for Personality and Social Psychology.

For 2024 he was awarded the BBVA Foundation Frontiers of Knowledge Award in the category "Social Sciences".
