= Carl Hovland =

American psychologist (1921–1961)

Carl I. Hovland
- Born: June 12, 1912; Chicago, Illinois, US
- Died: April 16, 1961 (aged 48); New Haven, Connecticut, US
- Education: Northwestern University; Yale University
- Scientific career
- Fields: Psychology
- Institutions: Yale University
- Thesis: The Generalization of Conditioned Responses (1936)
- Doctoral advisor: Clark L. Hull
- Doctoral students: Daniel Berlyne; Earl B. Hunt; Herbert Kelman; Lyman W. Porter; Roger Shepard; Lloyd Morrisett
- Other notable students: Albert Bregman

Carl Iver Hovland (June 12, 1912 – April 16, 1961) was a psychologist working primarily at Yale University and for the US Army during World War II who studied attitude change and persuasion. He first reported the sleeper effect after studying the effects of the Frank Capra propaganda film Why We Fight on soldiers in the Army. In later studies on this subject, Hovland collaborated with Irving Janis who would later become famous for his theory of groupthink. Hovland also developed social judgment theory of attitude change. Carl Hovland thought that the ability of someone to resist persuasion by a certain group depended on your degree of belonging to the group.

== Biography ==
Hovland was born in Chicago on June 12, 1912. He originally intended to pursue a career in music until college, when he discovered psychology. Before this discovery, during his high school years at Luther Institute in Chicago, he would meet a fellow piano student, Gertrude Raddatz. He would later come to marry her in 1938.

During Hovland’s initial pursuit of music, he would come to neglect his other classes that did not interest him as much, such as sports. Instead, an interest was toward music and science bloomed as Hovland became an excellent pianist. His love for the two merged with his promotion of his interests through a small shop he developed.

Hovland entered Northwestern University at the age of 16 and obtained his A.B. in 1932 and A.M. in the following year, working with Graydon L. Freeman. Hovland moved to Yale University where he received his Ph.D. in psychology in 1936 under the supervision of Clark L. Hull.

In 1942, Hovland was recruited by Samuel Stouffer, a sociologist on leave from the University of Chicago, to contribute to their collaborative research efforts. Hovland had the responsibility of leading a team of fifteen researchers.

Hovland was involved in a study of the conditions under which people are most likely to change their attitudes in response to persuasive messages. The Yale Group's work was first described in Hovland's book Communication and Persuasion, published in 1953.

With his life’s end approaching due to his cancer, his major interests in his last few years of life shifted from his verbal concept research to concept-formation. He would approach this idea with computer simulations [SG3] of human thought process

In his lifetime, Hovland was a member of the American Philosophical Society, the American Academy of Arts and Sciences, and the National Academy of Sciences.

== Contributions ==
Psychological research was Hovland's intellectual joy. Especially in his early career, his investigations covered many topics. His papers in psychological journals included a study of test reliability, a major review of the literature on apparent movement, as well as his four classical papers on conditioned generalization from his doctoral dissertation.

Hovland began to emphasize micro-level analysis of propaganda and its effects. Hovland's army experiments were the beginnings of that micro-level analysis of an individual. Hovland's "core conceptual variable was attitude".

Hovland believed that if he was able to recognize the attitude an individual has towards a trigger, he would be able to predict the behavior and actions of an individual over time. However, there were many studies that argued the contrary and showed that "an attitude toward a person or object does not predict or explain an individual's overt behavior regarding that person or object". This revelation of low correlation did not necessarily render findings useless but instead led to further research on how under certain circumstances it was possible to change a person's behavior via their attitudes.

While Hovland focused on an individual rather than a group level, he began to take into consideration interpersonal communication in the form of persuasion. Specifically, Hovland was responsible for carrying out a series of studies that contributed to the "cumulative understanding of persuasion behavior that has never since been matched or even rivaled".

To test and apply his theorization Hovland worked proposed the SMCR model. The SMCR model consists of four components—source variables, message variables, channel variables, and receiver variables. By manipulating each of these variables, Hovland was able to advance his "message-learning approach to attitude change". There were problems with his particular approach, however, in that by focusing on a single dimension of the SMCR model, Hovland was unable to do more than isolate a factor rather than study the synergy between the different variables.

== Death ==
Hovland died on April 16, 1961. When Hovland learned that he had cancer, he continued to work with his Yale doctoral students and conduct persuasion experiments. Finally, when he could work no more, he left his office in the Psychology Department, went to his home in New Haven, drew a bathtub full of water, and drowned himself.
