= Intrapersonal communication =

Communication with oneself

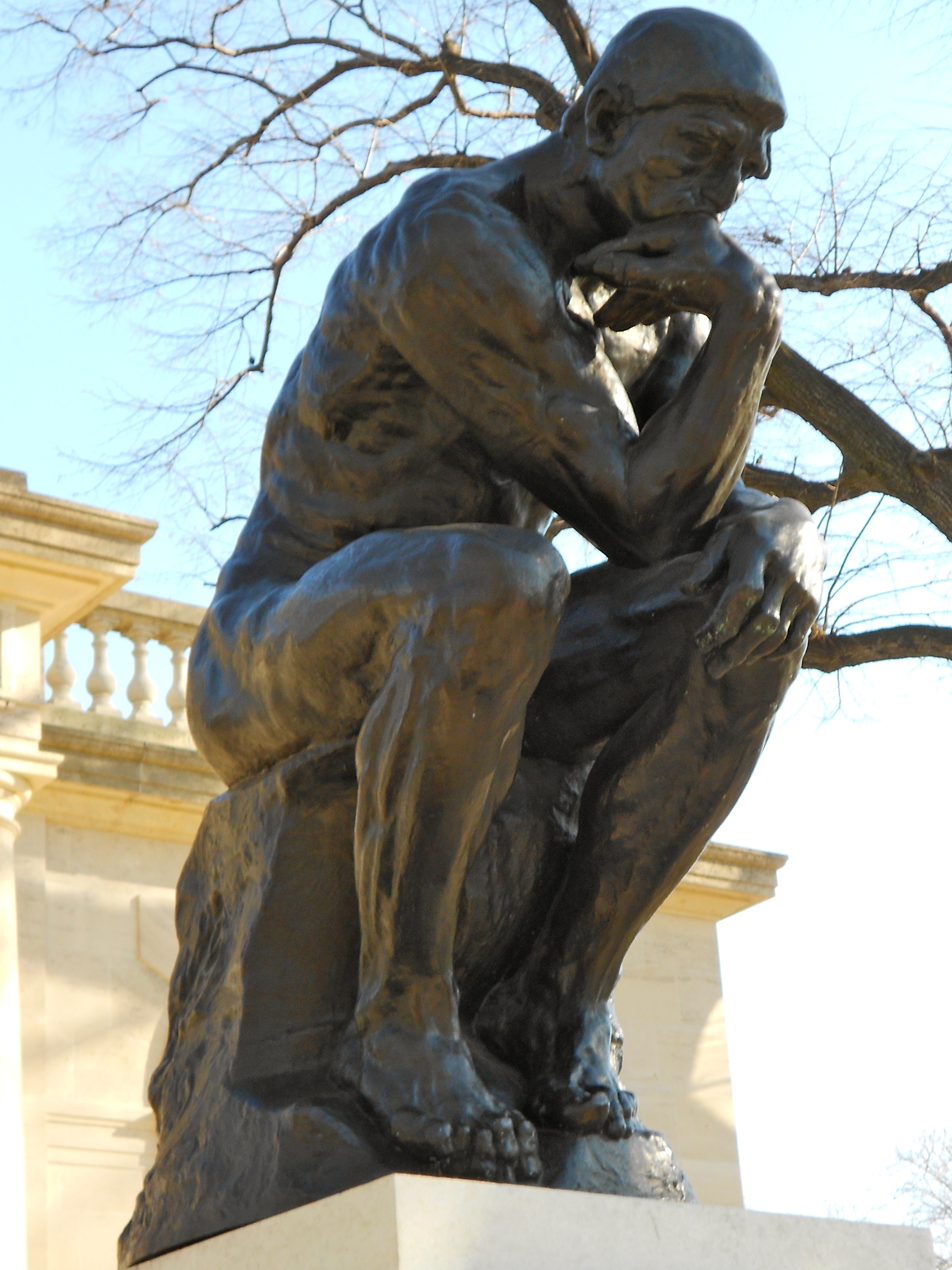
Intensive thinking to oneself is a common form of intrapersonal communication, as exemplified by Rodin's sculpture The Thinker.

Intrapersonal communication (also known as autocommunication or inner speech) is communication with oneself or self-to-self communication. Examples are thinking to oneself "I will do better next time" after having made a mistake and imagining a conversation with one's boss in preparation for requesting to leave work early. It is often understood as an exchange of messages in which the sender and the receiver are the same person. Some theorists use a wider definition that goes beyond message-based accounts and focuses on the role of meaning and making sense of things. Intrapersonal communication can happen alone or in social situations. It may be prompted internally or occur as a response to changes in the environment.

Intrapersonal communication encompasses a great variety of phenomena. A central type happens purely internally as an exchange within one's mind, and some researchers see this as the only form. In a wider sense, however, there are also types of self-to-self communication that are mediated through external means, like when writing a diary or a shopping list for oneself. For verbal intrapersonal communication, messages are formulated using language, in contrast to non-verbal forms sometimes used in imagination and memory. One contrast among inner verbal forms is between self-talk and inner dialogue. Self-talk involves only one voice talking to itself. For inner dialogue, several voices linked to different positions take turns in a form of imaginary interaction. Other phenomena related to intrapersonal communication include planning, problem-solving, perception, reasoning, self-persuasion, introspection, and dreaming.

Models of intrapersonal communication discuss which components are involved and how they interact. Many models hold that the process starts with the perception and interpretation of internal and external stimuli or cues. Later steps involve the symbolic encoding of a message that becomes a new stimulus. Some models identify the same self as sender and receiver. Others see the self as a complex entity and understand the process as an exchange between different parts of the self or between different selves belonging to the same person. Intrapersonal communication contrasts with interpersonal communication, in which the sender and the receiver are distinct persons. The two phenomena influence each other in various ways. For example, positive and negative feedback received from other people affects how a person talks to themself. Intrapersonal communication is involved in interpreting messages received from others and in formulating responses. Because of this role, some theorists hold that intrapersonal communication is the foundation of all communication. But this position is not generally accepted and an alternative is to hold that intrapersonal communication is an internalized version of interpersonal communication.

Because of its many functions and influences, intrapersonal communication is usually understood as a significant psychological phenomenon. It plays a key role in mental health, specifically in relation to positive and negative self-talk. Negative self-talk focuses on bad aspects of the self, at times in an excessively critical way. It is linked to psychological stress, anxiety, and depression. A step commonly associated with countering negative self-talk is to become aware of negative patterns. Further steps are to challenge the truth of overly critical judgments and to foster more positive patterns of thought. Of special relevance in this regard is the self-concept, i.e. how a person sees themself, specifically their self-esteem or how they evaluate their abilities and characteristics. Intrapersonal communication is not as thoroughly researched as other forms of communication. One reason is that it is more difficult to study since it happens primarily as an internal process. Another reason is that the term is often used in a very wide sense making it difficult to demarcate which phenomena belong to it.

== Definition and essential features ==
Intrapersonal communication is communication with oneself. It takes place within a person. Larry Barker and Gordon Wiseman define it as "the creating, functioning, and evaluating of symbolic processes which operate primarily within oneself". Its most typical forms are self-talk and inner dialogue. For example, when an employee decides to leave work early, they may engage in an inner dialogue by mentally going through possible negative comments from their boss and potential responses. Other inner experiences are also commonly included, such as imagination, visualization, and memory. As a form of communication, it involves the sending and receiving of messages. It is a self-to-self communication, in the sense that the sender and the receiver is the same person. It contrasts with interpersonal communication, in which sender and receiver are distinct persons. Intrapersonal communication is examined by the discipline known as communication studies.

Some theorists, like James Watson and Anne Hill, restrict the definition of intrapersonal communication to inner experiences or "what goes on inside our heads", like talking to oneself within one's mind. But in a wider sense, it also includes external forms of self-to-self communication, such as speaking to oneself aloud during private speech or writing a diary or a shopping list. In this regard, it only matters that the sender and the receiver is the same person but it does not matter whether an external medium was used in the process. A slightly different conception is presented by Piotr K. Oleś et al. They reject the idea that sender and receiver have to be the same person. This is based on the idea that one can have imaginary dialogues with other people, such as a friend, a teacher, a lost relative, or a celebrity. Oleś et al. hold instead that the hallmark of intrapersonal communication is that it only happens in the mind of one person. Some scholars see the process of searching and interpreting information as a central aspect of intrapersonal communication. This applies specifically to inner monologues and reflections on oneself, other people, and the environment. Frank J. Macke and Dean Barnlund stress that the mechanical exchange of messages is not sufficient and that intrapersonal communication has to do with meaning and making sense of things. In this regard, intrapersonal communication can be distinguished from intraorganismic communication, which takes place below the personal level as an exchange of information between organs or cells.

Intrapersonal communication need not be cut off from outer influences and often happens as a reaction to them. For example, hearing a familiar piece of music may stir up memories that lead to an internal dialog with past selves. In a similar sense, intrapersonal communication is not restricted to situations in which a person is alone. Instead, it also happens in social circumstances and may occur simultaneously with interpersonal communication. This is the case, for example, when interpreting what another person has said and when formulating a response before enunciating it. Some theorists, like Mary J. Farley, hold that intrapersonal communication is an essential part of all communication and, therefore, always accompanies interpersonal communication.

In the context of organizations, the term "autocommunication" is sometimes used as a synonym. It is employed to describe self-communication in the workspace. For example, synchronous autocommunication is used when mentally reassuring oneself or drafting a letter. Asynchronous autocommunication, on the other hand, takes the form of reminders or diaries. This term is also sometimes used in semiotics.

== Types ==
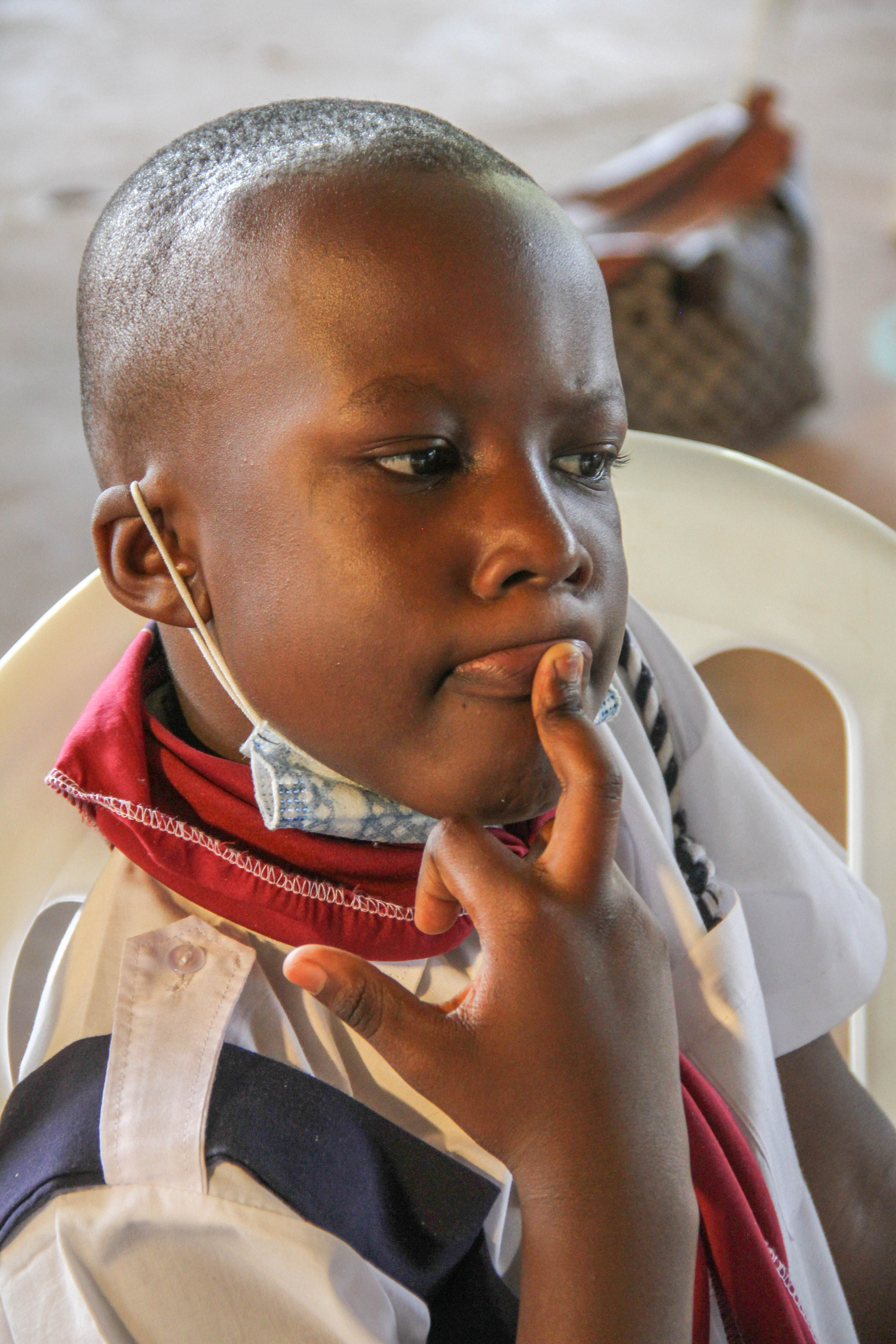
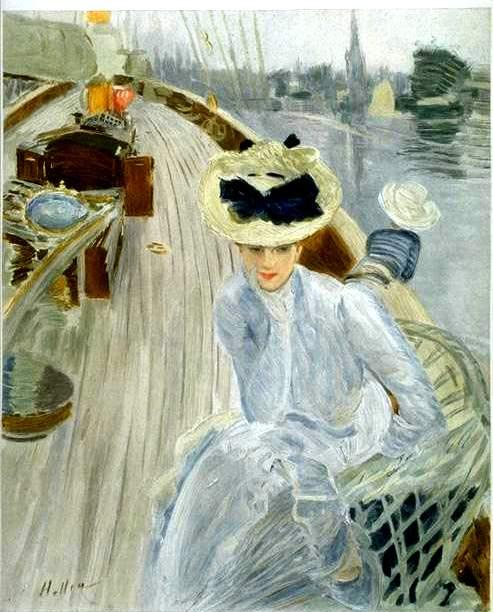
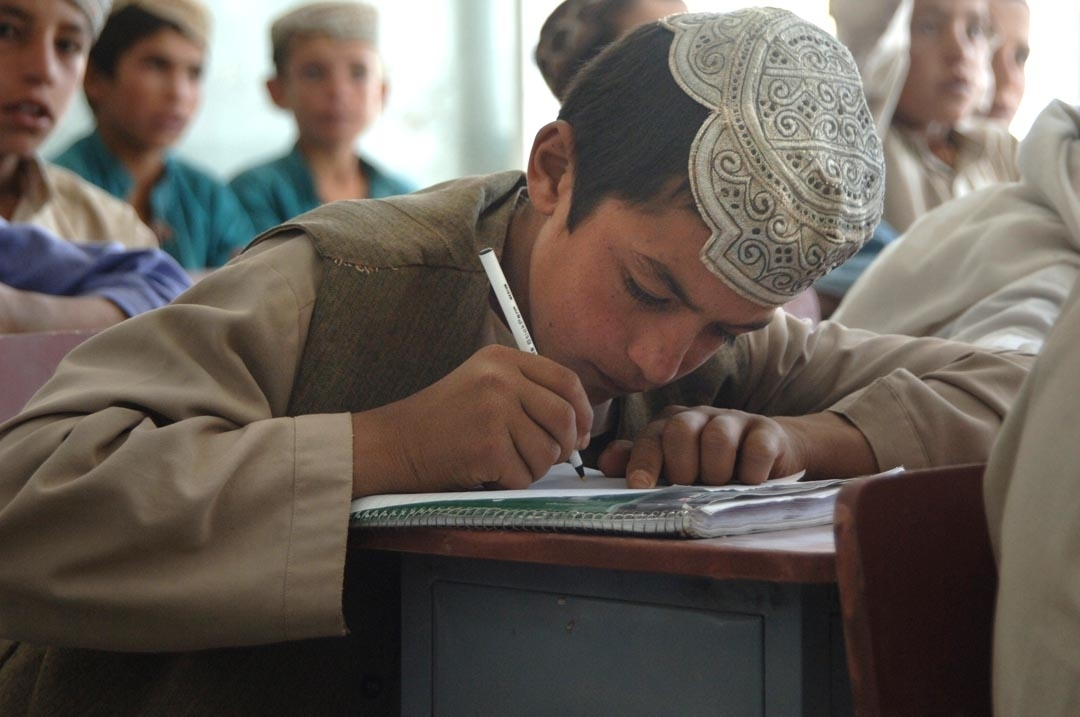
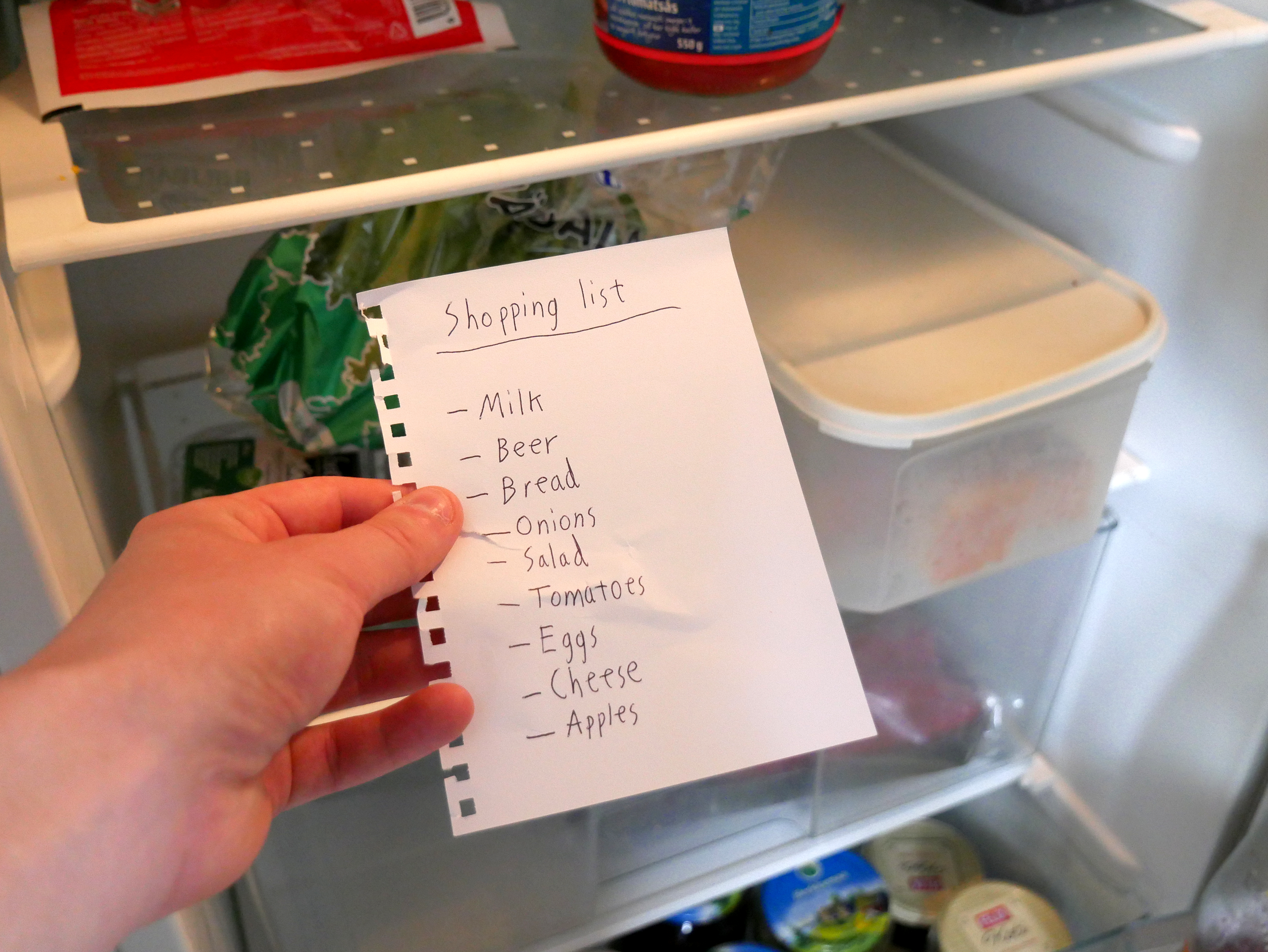
The most typical forms of intrapersonal communication happen internally, like thinking and daydreaming (top images). However, some forms make use of an external medium, like note taking at school or writing a shopping list for oneself (bottom images).

Various types of intrapersonal communication are distinguished in the academic literature. The term is often used in a very wide sense and includes many phenomena. A central contrast is based on whether the exchange happens purely internally or is mediated through external means. The internal type is the most discussed form. It plays out in the mind of one person without externally expressing the message. It includes mental processes like thinking, meditating, and reflecting. However, there are also external forms of intrapersonal communication, like talking aloud to oneself in the form of private speech. Other examples are notetaking at school, writing a diary, preparing a shopping list, praying, or reciting a poem. External intrapersonal communication is also characterized by the fact that the sender and the receiver is the same person. The difference is that an external medium is used to express the message.

Another distinction focuses on the role of language. Most discussions in the academic literature are concerned with verbal intrapersonal communication, like self-talk and inner dialogue. Its hallmark is that messages are expressed using a symbolic coding system in the form of a language. They contrast with non-verbal forms like some forms of imagination, visualization, or memory. In this regard, intrapersonal communication can be used, for example, to explore how a piece of music would sound or how a painting should be continued.

Among the inner verbal forms of intrapersonal communication, an often-discussed contrast is between self-talk and inner dialogue. In the case of inner dialogue, two or more positions are considered and the exchange takes place by contrasting them. It usually happens in the form of different voices taking turns in arguing for their position. This can be conceptualized in analogy to interpersonal communication as an exchange of different subjects, selves, or I-positions within the same person. For example, when facing a difficult decision, one part of a person may argue in favor of one option while another part prefers a different option. Inner dialogue can also take the form of an exchange with an imagined partner. This is the case when anticipating a discussion with one's spouse or during imaginary conversations with celebrities or lost relatives. For self-talk or inner monologue, on the other hand, there is no split between different positions. It is speech directed at oneself, as when commenting on one's performance or telling oneself to "try again". Self-talk can be positive or negative depending on how the person evaluates themself. For example, after having failed an exam, a student may engage in negative self-talk by saying "I'm so stupid" or in positive self-talk, like "don't worry" or "I'll do better next time".

There are many differences between self-talk and inner dialogue. Inner dialogue is usually more complex. It can be used to simulate social situations and examine a topic from different angles. Its goal is frequently to explore the differences between conflicting points of view, to make sense of strange positions, and to integrate different perspectives. It also plays a central role in identity construction and self-organization. One function of self-talk is self-regulation. Other functions include self-distancing, motivation, self-evaluation, and reflection. Self-talk often happens in reaction to or anticipation of certain situations. It can help the agent prepare an appropriate response. It may also be used to regulate emotions and cope with unpleasant experiences as well as monitor oneself. Self-talk and inner dialogue are distinct phenomena but one can quickly turn into the other. For example, an intrapersonal communication may start as self-talk and then evolve into inner dialogue as more positions are considered.

Intrapersonal communication is linked to a range of phenomena including planning, problem-solving, and internal conflict resolution, as well as judgments about oneself and other people. Other forms are perception and understanding as well as conceptualization and interpretation of environmental cues. Further phenomena are data processing like drawing inferences, thinking, and self-persuasion as well as memory, introspection, dreaming, imagining, and feeling.

== Models ==
Various models of communication have been proposed. They aim to provide a simplified overview of the process of communication by showing what its main components are and how they interact. Most of them focus primarily on interpersonal communication but some are specifically formulated with intrapersonal communication in mind.

Barker and Wiseman understand intrapersonal communication as a complex process involving the interaction of various elements.

According to the model proposed by Barker and Wiseman in 1966, intrapersonal communication starts with the reception of external and internal stimuli carrying information. External stimuli belong to the senses and usually provide information about the environment. Internal stimuli include a wide range of impressions, both concerning the state of the body, like pain, but also encompassing feelings.

In the Barker-Wiseman model, an early step of intrapersonal communication focuses on classifying these stimuli. In this process, many of the weaker stimuli are filtered out before reaching a conscious level. But they may still affect communication despite this. A similar process groups the remaining stimuli according to their urgency. It runs in parallel with attempts to attach symbolic meaning to the stimuli as a form of decoding. How these processes take place is influenced by factors like the communicator's social background and current environment. After the symbolic decoding process, ideation occurs in the form of thinking, organizing information, planning, and proposing messages. As a last step, the thus conceived ideas are encoded into a symbolic form and expressed using words, gestures, or movements. This process can happen right after the ideation or with some delay. It results in the generation and transmission of more stimuli, either purely internal or also external. The generated stimuli work as a feedback loop leading back to their reception and interpretation. In this sense, the same person is both the sender and the receiver of the messages. The feedback makes it possible for the communicator to monitor and correct messages.

Barnlund's model of intrapersonal communication. The green, blue, and gray areas symbolize different types of cues. The orange arrows represent that the person decodes certain cues. The yellow arrow is their behavioral response.

Another model of communication was proposed by Dean Barnlund in 1970. He aims to give an account of communication that encompasses both its interpersonal and its intrapersonal side. He identifies communication not with the transmission of messages but with the production of meaning in response to internal and external cues. For him, intrapersonal communication is the simpler case since only one person is involved. This person perceives private cues, like internal thoughts and feelings, public cues originating from the environment, and behavioral cues in the form of their own behavior. One part of communication is the process of decoding and interpreting these cues. Its goal is to make sense of them and to reduce uncertainty. It is accompanied by the activity of encoding behavioral responses to the cues. These two processes happen simultaneously and influence each other.

Sheila Steinberg follows Graeme Burton and Richard Dimbleby by understanding intrapersonal communication as a process involving five elements: decoding, integration, memory, perceptual sets, and encoding. Decoding consists in making sense of messages. Integration puts the individual pieces of information extracted this way in relation to each other through processes like comparing and contrasting. Memory stores previously received information. Especially relevant in regard to intrapersonal communication is the concept one has of oneself and how the newly received information relates to it. Perceptual sets are ingrained ways of organizing and evaluating this information, for example, how feminine and masculine traits are conceived. Encoding is the last step, in which the meaning processed in the previous steps is again expressed in symbolic form as a message sent to oneself.

Many theorists focus on the concept of the self in intrapersonal communication. There is a variety of definitions but many agree that the self is an entity that is unique to each individual, i.e. not shared between individuals. Some theorists understand intrapersonal communication as a relation of the self to the same self. Others see the self as a complex entity made up of different parts and analyze the exchange as an interaction between parts. A closely related approach is to talk not of distinct parts of a single self but of different selves in the same person, like an emotional self, an intellectual self, or a physical self. On these views, intrapersonal communication is understood in analogy to interpersonal communication as an exchange between different parts or selves. In either case, intrapersonal relationships play a central role. They concern how a person relates to themselves, for example, how they see themselves and who they wish to be. Intrapersonal relationships are not directly observable. Instead, they have to be inferred based on other changes that can be perceived. For example, inferences about a person's self-esteem can be drawn based on whether they respond to a compliment by bragging or by playing it down.

== Relation to interpersonal communication ==
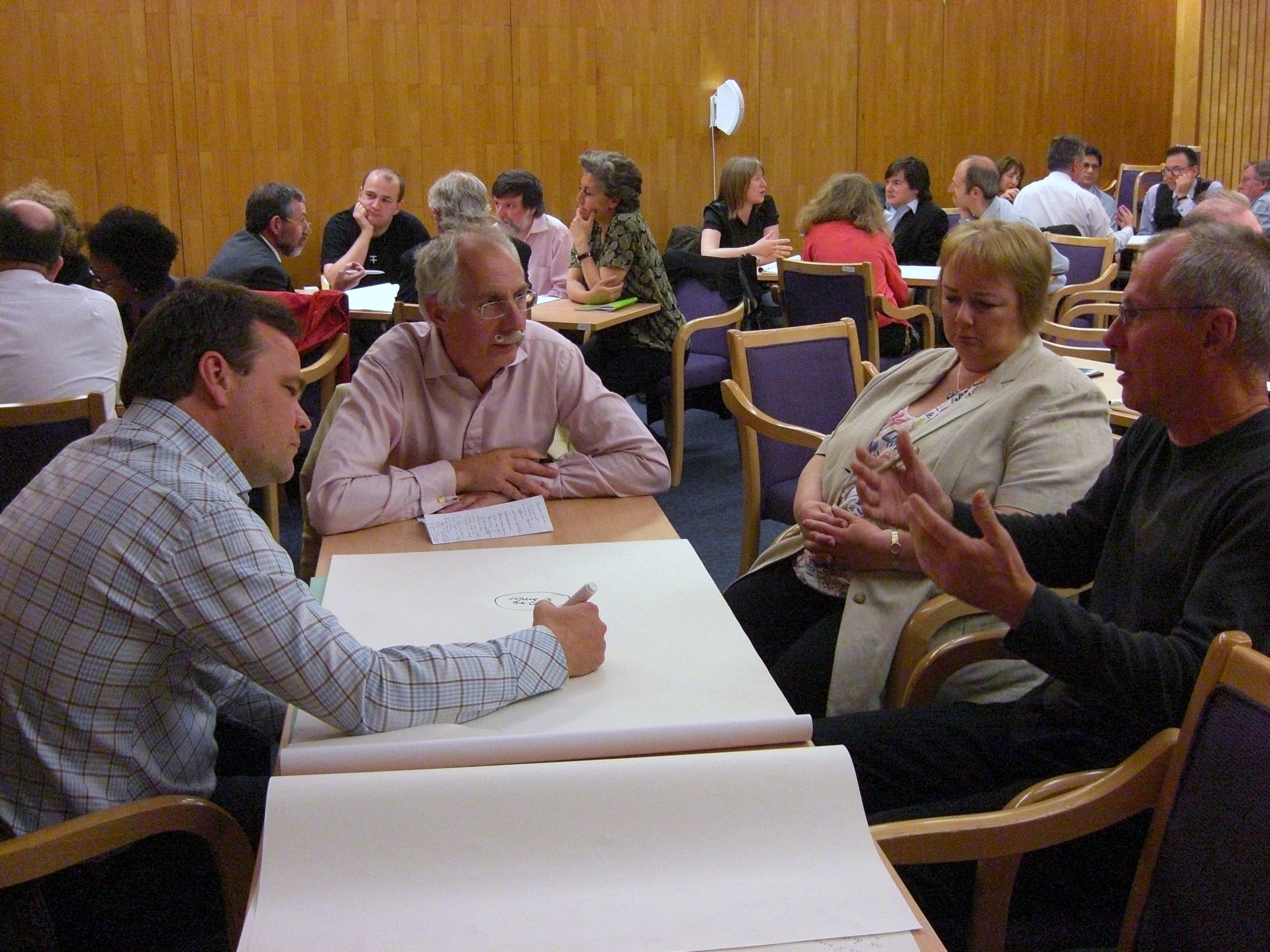
Intrapersonal communication contrasts with interpersonal communication, in which several people are involved.

Both intrapersonal and interpersonal communication involve the exchange of messages. For interpersonal communication, the sender and the receiver are distinct persons, like when talking to a friend on the phone. For intrapersonal communication, one and the same person occupies both of these roles. Despite this difference, the two are closely related. For example, some theorists, like Linda Costigan Lederman, conceptualize inner dialogue in analogy to social interaction as an exchange between different parts of the self.

The two phenomena also influence each other in various ways. For example, the positive and negative feedback a person receives from other people shapes their self-concept or how they see themselves. This in turn has implications for how they talk to themselves in the form of positive or negative self-talk. But the converse is also true: how a person talks to themselves affects how they interact with other people. One reason for this is that some form of inner dialog is usually involved when talking to others to interpret what they say and to determine what one wants to communicate to them. For example, if a person's intrapersonal communication is characterized by self-criticism, this may make it hard for them to accept praise from other people. On a more basic level, it can affect how messages from other people are interpreted. For example, an overly self-critical person may interpret an honest compliment as a form of sarcasm.

However, self-talk may also interfere with the ability to listen. For example, when a person has an important meeting later today, their thoughts may be racing around this topic, making the person less responsive to interactions in the present. In some cases, the listener is very keen on making a response. This may cause their attention to focus mainly on their self-talk formulating a message. As a result, they may miss important aspects of what the current speaker is saying. Positive and effective self-talk, on the other hand, tends to make people better at communicating with others. One way to become better at interpersonal communication is to become aware of this self-talk and to be able to balance it with the need of listening.

Another discussion in the academic literature is about the question of whether intrapersonal communication is in some sense more basic than interpersonal communication. This is based on the idea that some form of intrapersonal communication is necessary for and accompanies interpersonal communication. For example, when a person receives a message from a friend inviting them to their favorite restaurant, there are often various internal reactions to this message before sending an answer in return. These reactions include sights and scents, memories from previous visits, checking whether this would clash with other plans, and devising a route to get to the restaurant. These reactions are forms of intrapersonal communication. Other examples include self-talk in an attempt to evaluate the positions expressed by the speaker to assess whether one agrees or disagrees with them. But intrapersonal communication can also occur by itself without another party being involved.

For these reasons, some theorists, like James Honeycutt and Sheila Steinberg, have claimed that intrapersonal communication is the foundation of all other forms of communication. Similar claims are that intrapersonal communication is omnipresent and that it is a requirement or preliminary of interpersonal communication. However, the claim of the primacy of intrapersonal communication is not generally accepted and many theorists hold that social interaction is more basic, seeing inner speech as an internalized or derivative version of social speech.

A closely related issue concerns the questions of how interpersonal and intrapersonal communication interact in the development of children. According to Jean Piaget, for example, intrapersonal communication develops first and manifests as a form of egocentric speech. This happens during play activities and may help the child learn to control their activities and plan ahead. Piaget holds that, at this early stage, children are not yet fully social beings and are more concerned with developing their individuality. On this view, interpersonal speech only arises later in the person's development. This view is opposed by Lev Vygotsky, who argues that intrapersonal communication only happens as an internalization of interpersonal communication. According to him, children learn the tools for self-talk when their parents talk to them to regulate their behavior, for example, through suggestions, warnings, or commands. Intrapersonal communication may then be understood as an attempt by the child to regulate their behavior through similar means.

== Function and importance ==
Intrapersonal communication serves a great variety of functions, including internalization, self-regulation, processing information, and problem-solving. Due to this, communication theorist James P. Lantolf characterizes it as an "exceptionally powerful and pervasive tool for thinking". He identifies two significant functions: to internalize cultural norms or ways of thinking and to regulate one's own activity. The self-regulatory function of intrapersonal communication is sometimes understood in analogy to interpersonal communication. For example, parents may influence the behavior of their children by uttering phrases like "wait, think". Once the child has learned them, they can be employed to control behavior by uttering them internally. This way, people learn to modify, accept, or reject plans of action.

According to Larry Ehrlich, intrapersonal communication has three main functions. One function is to monitor the environment and ensure that it is safe. In this regard, self-talk is used to analyze perceptions and to plan responses in case direct or indirect threats are detected. A closely related function is to bring harmony between the inner and outer world by making sense of oneself and one's environment. A third function is of a more existential nature and aims at dealing with loneliness. Many theorists also draw a close connection to the processes of searching and interpreting information.

Inner speech may be needed for many higher mental processes to work. It has a vital role in mental functions such as shaping and controlling one's thoughts, regulating one's behavior, reasoning, problem-solving, and planning as well as remembering. It often accompanies diverse communicative tasks, such as listening, speaking, reading, and writing, for example, to understand an expression or to formulate a new one. More specific applications are to calm oneself down in stressful situations and to internalize new knowledge when learning a second language. This happens when repeating new vocabulary to oneself in order to remember it. Intrapersonal communication can also be applied to a great variety of creative tasks, like using it to come up with musical compositions, paintings, or dance routines.

Stanley B. Cunningham lists a total of 17 functions or characteristics commonly ascribed to intrapersonal communication. They include talking to oneself, dialogue between different parts of the self, and perception as well as interpreting environmental cues and ascribing meaning to them. Further functions are problem-solving, decision-making, introspection, reflection, dreaming, and self-persuasion. The goal of some external forms of intrapersonal communication, like taking notes at school or writing a shopping list, is to aid memory. In some cases, they can also help break down and address a complex problem in a series of smaller steps, as when solving a mathematical equation line by line.

The importance of intrapersonal communication is reflected by how it affects other phenomena. For example, it has been argued that people who engage in positive self-talk are usually better at problem-solving and communicating with others, including listening skills. Negative intrapersonal communication, on the other hand, is linked to insecurities and low self-esteem and may lead to negative interactions with others. For example, people suffering from the imposter syndrome are continuously affected by self-doubt and anxiety. Their negative intrapersonal communication tends to revolve around fears that their skills are inadequate and may be exposed. In this regard, intrapersonal communication affects a person's self-view, their emotions, and whether they see themself as capable or incompetent. It can help build and maintain self-confidence but may also create defense mechanisms. Additionally, it plays a central role in self-discovery and self-delusion.

=== In literature ===
Intrapersonal communication is also relevant in the field of literature. Of particular interest to literary studies is the term "stream of consciousness". As a mental phenomenon, it is a continuous flow of momentary states of consciousness as they are lived through by the subject. They include experiences like sensory perceptions, thoughts, feelings, and memories. The stream of consciousness is usually seen as a form of intrapersonal communication and the term is sometimes used as a synonym for interior monologue. In literary criticism, the term refers to a narrative technique or a style of writing used to express this stream of experiences. This usually happens by presenting the thoughts of a character directly without any summary or explanation by the narrator. It aims to give the reader a very immediate impression of what a character's experience is like. It often takes an unpunctuated and disjointed form that violates rules of grammar and logic. Often-discussed examples are found in Dorothy Richardson's Pilgrimage, James Joyce's Ulysses, and Virginia Woolf's Mrs Dalloway. Closely related phenomena are introspective writing and inner speech writing. They are usually understood as forms of externalized inner speech in which the person writes down portions of their inner dialogue.

== Relation to mental health ==
The way intrapersonal communication is conducted can be responsible both for positive mental health and mental illness. This pertains specifically to positive and negative self-talk as well as its relation to the self-concept.

=== Positive and negative self-talk ===
Self-talk differs from inner dialogue in that it only involves one voice and not an internal exchange between several voices. A common distinction is between positive and negative self-talk based on the evaluative attitude that is expressed. For negative self-talk, the inner voice focuses on bad aspects of the self, often in an excessively critical way. It can take the form of telling oneself that "I'm never going to be able to do this" or "I'm no good at this". Negative self-talk can already develop during childhood based on feedback from others, particularly parents.

When negative self-talk is not just an occasional occurrence, it can have detrimental effects on mental health. For example, it can affect emotional well-being by evoking a negative mood, leading to stress, anxiety, and depression. It can also negatively affect a person's confidence. For example, they may develop a negative body image. Positive self-talk, on the other hand, involves seeing oneself in a positive light and is linked to mental health benefits. They include higher self-esteem and well-being as well as reducing the effects of depression and personality disorders. It is associated with lower stress levels and a reduced risk of self-harm and suicide. The effects of positive and negative self-talk are often discussed in sport psychology. A common idea in this regard is that positive self-talk enhances performance while negative self-talk hinders it. There is some empirical evidence supporting this position but it has not yet been thoroughly researched.

Intrapersonal communication can be trained and improved to be more effective. For example, individuals can practice to reduce negative self-talk and foster positive self-talk instead. This may be done by becoming aware of negative patterns and acknowledging their existence, followed by questioning and challenging exaggerated negative evaluations. The person may also try to stop them and replace them with more positive thoughts. For example, when the person becomes aware of a negative thinking process, they may try to inhibit it and direct their attention to more positive outcomes.

A similar approach is used in cognitive behavioral therapy. A central idea in this field is that a set of negative core beliefs is responsible for negative self-talk. They can include beliefs like "I'm unlovable", "I'm unworthy", or "the world is threatening and I'm unable to face its challenges". A key therapeutic method for improving intrapersonal communication is to become aware of these beliefs and to question their truth. A further approach focuses on the practice of mindfulness. By raising self-awareness, it may improve self-esteem and intrapersonal communication. This practice consists in directing one's attention to experiences in the present moment without any evaluation of these experiences. Abstaining from value judgments may help to avoid overly critical evaluations and instead foster an attitude of acceptance.

==== Specific forms of self-talk and their effects ====
Different forms of self-talk can have different effects on the person. One form is coping self-talk. Its main aim is to help a person cope with a difficult situation, such as when experiencing anxiety. It consists in emphasizing the person's strengths and skills without implying perfection. This can help people calm down and become clear on their goals and how to realistically achieve them. Another relevant form is instructional self-talk, which focuses attention on the components of a task and can improve performance on physical tasks that are being learned. However, it may have negative effects for people who are already skilled in the task.

Some forms of self-talk address the self by employing first-person pronouns ("I") while others use second-person pronouns ("you"). Generally speaking, people are more likely to use the second-person pronoun when there is a need for self-regulation, an imperative to overcome difficulties, and facilitation of hard actions. The use of first-person intrapersonal pronouns is more frequent when people are talking to themselves about their feelings. A 2014 study by Sanda Dolcos and Dolores Albarracin indicates that using the second-person pronoun to provide self-suggestions is more effective in promoting the intentions to carry out behaviors and performances.

=== Self-concept and self-esteem ===
The self-concept plays a key role in intrapersonal communication. A person's self-concept is what they think and feel about themselves, for example, in relation to their appearance and attitudes as well as strengths and weaknesses. So seeing oneself as sincere, respectful, and thoughtful is one self-concept while seeing oneself as mean, abusive, and deceitful is another. The terms "self-image" and "self-esteem" are sometimes used as synonyms but some theorists draw precise distinctions between them. According to Carl Rogers, the self-concept has three parts: self-image, ideal self, and self-worth. Self-image concerns the properties that a person ascribes to themself. The ideal-self is the ideal the person strives toward or what they want to be like. Self-worth corresponds to whether they see themself overall as a good or a bad person.

Many theorists use the term "self-esteem" instead of "self-worth". Self-esteem is a central aspect characterizing intrapersonal communication and refers to a person's subjective evaluation of their abilities and characteristics. As a subjective evaluation, it may differ from the facts and is often based mainly on an emotional outlook and less on a rational judgment. For example, some skilled people suffer from the imposter syndrome, which leads them to believe that they are imposters lacking the skills they actually have. Self-esteem matters for mental health. Low self-esteem is linked to problems ranging from depression, loneliness, and alienation to drug abuse and teenage pregnancy. Self-esteem also affects how a person communicates with themself and others.

The self is not a static or inborn entity but changes throughout life. Interactions with other people have an effect on the individual's self-image. This is especially true in relation to how they judge the person and when receiving positive or negative feedback on an important task. Inner speech is strongly associated with a sense of self. The development of this sense in children is tied to the development of language. There are, however, cases of an internal monologue or inner voice being considered external to the self. Examples are auditory hallucinations, the conceptualization of negative or critical thoughts as an inner critic, or a kind of divine intervention. As a delusion, this can be called "thought insertion". A similar topic is discussed by Simon Jones and Charles Fernyhough, who explain cases of auditory verbal hallucinations as a form of inner speech. Auditory verbal hallucinations are cases in which a person hears speech without any external stimulation. On their view, speech is an inner action controlled by the agent. But in some pathological cases, it is not recognized as an action. This leads to an auditory verbal hallucination since the voice is experienced as an external or alien element.

== Research and criticism ==
Intrapersonal communication has not been researched as thoroughly as other types of communication. One reason is that there are additional problems concerning how to study it and how to conceptualize it. A difficulty in this regard is that it is not as easy to observe as interpersonal communication. This is due to the fact that it mostly occurs internally without an immediate external manifestation. Since it is not directly observable, it has to be inferred based on other changes that can be visible. For example, when seeing that a person dresses well and takes care of their health, one may infer that certain intrapersonal relationships are responsible for this behavior. A similar inference about a person's inner life could be drawn based on whether they respond to a compliment by bragging or by playing it down.

A further approach is to use questionnaires to study intrapersonal communication. Questionnaires sometimes used in the process include the Self-Talk Scale, the Varieties of Inner Speech Questionnaire, and the Internal Dialogical Activity Scale. Among other things, they aim to measure what types of intrapersonal communication a person engages in and how frequently they do so. Younger children are less likely to report using inner speech instead of visual thinking than older children and adults. But it is not known whether this is due to lack of inner speech or due to insufficiently developed introspection. A method to study intrapersonal communication in natural environments, developed by Russell Hurlburt, is to have participants describe their inner experience at random intervals the moment a beeper goes off.

Some criticisms focus on the concept of intrapersonal communication itself. Intrapersonal communication is commonly accepted and used as a distinct type of communication. However, some theorists reject the claim that it is actually a form of communication. Instead, they see it as a different phenomenon that is merely related to communication. A prominent defender of this position is Cunningham. He argues that many inner experiences discussed under this label form part of communicative processes, but are not instances of communication in themselves. This pertains to forms of cognitive, perceptual, and motivational episodes commonly categorized as intrapersonal communication. He sees such categorizations as an "uncritical extension of communication terminology and metaphors to the facts of our inner life space." This is closely connected to the problem that the expression "intrapersonal communication" is often used in a very wide and ambiguous sense. However, some theorists have objected to Cunningham's critique. One argument is that communication studies in general is a multiparadigmatic discipline. This implies that it has not yet established definitions of its terms that are both precise and generally accepted. According to this view, the lack of precision does not mean that the concept is useless.

A further problem in defining intrapersonal communication is that there are countless processes within the human body responsible for exchanging messages. So when understood in this very wide sense, even processes like breathing could be understood as intrapersonal communication. For this reason, the term is usually understood in a more restricted sense. Frank J. Macke approaches this problem by arguing that intrapersonal communication has to do with meaning and that some form of communicative experience is involved. On this view, the mechanical exchange of messages alone is not sufficient for communication.

== See also ==
- Autosuggestion – Psychological technique related to the placebo effect
- Dialogical self – The mind's ability to imagine different positions of participants in an internal dialogue
- Dream speech – Words in the mind during sleep
- Friedemann Schulz von Thun – German psychologist
- Inner Team – Personality model
- Internal Family Systems Model – Psychotherapeutic modality focusing on internal parts and Self-leadership
- Subvocalization – Internal process while reading
- Transverse temporal gyrus#Inner voice – Gyrus of the primary auditory cortex of the brain
- Diary – Record of events with entries arranged by date
