= Donald W. Klopf =

American communication scholar and educator

- Born: Donald William Klopf; January 22, 1923; Milwaukee, Wisconsin
- Died: August 27, 2010 (aged 87); Kailua, Hawaii
- Education: B.A., University of Hawaii; M.A., University of Hawaii; Ph.D., University of Washington
- Alma mater: University of Washington, University of Hawaii
- Occupations: Professor, Researcher, Educator, Debate Coach
- Writing career
- Language: English
- Subjects: Debate, Public Speaking, Rhetoric, Intercultural Communication, Interpersonal Communication
- Notable works: Intercultural Encounters, Personal and Public Speaking

Donald W. Klopf (January 22, 1923 – August 27, 2010) was an American intercultural communication researcher and speech communication educator. He was Professor Emeritus in the Department of Speech at the University of Hawaii at Manoa and in the Department of Communication Studies at West Virginia University. He was nationally and internationally known as the father of communication studies in the Pacific-Asian region.

== Education and career ==
Klopf was born in Milwaukee, Wisconsin. His father, Milton H. Klopf, owned a jewelry store in Bay View. He was an Army Air Force veteran. He received his B.A. in 1953 and M.A. in 1955, both in Speech from the University of Hawaii at Manoa and his Ph.D. in Speech from the University of Washington in 1958. He completed his postdoctoral studies at the University of Wisconsin and Northwestern University.

Klopf joined the faculty of UH-Manoa in 1958. He was Chair of the Department of Speech, Director of Forensics, and Director of Courses and Curricula for the Continuing Education College. He retired from UH-Manoa in 1982. He then taught at West Virginia University from 1982 to 1992, where he served as Associate Chair of the Department of Communication Studies.

Klopf authored more than 40 books and over 200 articles on debate and argumentation, interpersonal/small group communication, and cross-cultural/intercultural communication. He was President of the Pacific Speech Association and Founding Presidents of the Communication Association of the Pacific (CAP), the World Communication Association (WCA), and the Pacific and Asian Communication Association (PACA). He played a key role in bringing together researchers and educators around the world for communication studies in the global context.

J. Jeffery Auer, who served as President of the WCA for 1985-1991, attested: "Don Klopf’s genius lay not only in teaching and scholarship, but also in his organizational skills, in accomplishing goals for his associations through astute moves, such as accepting early on that individual teachers in the Pacific countries would be most easily attracted to a regional association and attend their conventions through membership in their own national associations."

Klopf collaborated with leading Asian communication scholars such as Satoshi Ishii at Dokkyo University and Takehide Kawashima at Nihon University in Japan (Presidents of the Communication Association of Japan) and Myung-Seok Park at Dankook University in South Korea (President of the Communication Association of Korea) from the 1970s to 1990s and conducted countless cross-national comparative studies of communication practices. Their research findings have been cited in numerous scholarly books and journal articles across disciplines. They also appeared in The Hawaii Times, The Japan Times, and The Korea Times.

Klopf died in his home in Kailua, Hawaii. The special issue of the Journal of Intercultural Communication Research (JICR) on “Asia-Pacific Communication” (Vol. 39, No. 3, November 2010) was dedicated to him in honor of his lifetime contributions to international and intercultural relations in the Pacific-Asian region. Jerry L. Allen, then Editor-in-Chief, gratefully acknowledged Klopf's foresight and vision for the WCA's journal, World Communication, which was later renamed as the JICR.

Myung-Seok Park remarked at the 9th Biennial Convention of the Pacific and Asian Communication Association in Seoul, South Korea, on July 6–9, 2012: "Don's lifelong efforts and devotion to the society as well as his untiring zeal and consuming curiosity in studying intercultural communication made a most striking impression upon us. We will forever miss his commitment to the society and his academic presence. We were also lucky and grateful to have had such a precious and faithful friend in Don. We will surely cherish the dear memories of him for a long time deep in our hearts.”

== Publications ==
=== Books ===
- Klopf, D. W. (1994). Coaching and directing forensics. National Textbook.
- Klopf, D. W. (1994). Interacting in groups: Theory and practice (4th ed.). Morton.
- Klopf, D. W. (2001). Intercultural encounters: The fundamentals of intercultural communication (5th ed.). Morton.
- Klopf, D. W., & Cambra, R. E. (1979). Academic debate: Practicing argumentative theory. Morton.
- Klopf, D. W., & Cambra, R. E. (1991). Speaking skills for prospective teachers (2nd ed.). Morton.
- Klopf, D. W., & Cambra, R. E. (1996). Personal and public speaking (5th ed.). Morton.
- Klopf, D. W., Cambra, R. E., & Ishii, S. (1995). Japanese communicative behavior: Recent research findings. Pacific & Asian Press.
- Klopf, D. W., & Kawashima, T. (1995). The bases of public speaking (10th ed.). Sanshusha.
- Klopf, D. W., & Kawashima, T. (1996). The bases of debate (3rd. ed.). Sanshusha.
- Klopf, D. W., & Ishii, S. (1984). Communicating effectively across cultures. Nanundo.
- Klopf, D. W., & Ishii, S. (1987). Communicating without words. Nanundo.
- Klopf, D. W., & Ishii, S. (1989). Communicating person-to-person. Kirihara Shoten.
- Klopf, D. W., & Ishii, S. (1989). Effective oral communication. Eihosha.
- Klopf, D. W., & McCroskey, J. C. (1969). The elements of debate. Arco.
- Klopf, D. W., & McCroskey, J. C. (2007). Intercultural communication encounters. Allyn & Bacon.
- Klopf, D. W., & Park, M.-S. (1982). Cross-cultural communication: An introduction to the fundamentals. Han Shin.
- Klopf, D. W., & Park, M.-S. (1983). Elements of human communication. Han Shin.
- Klopf, D. W., & Park, M.-S. (1997). Korean communicative behavior: Recent research findings. Dankook University Press.
- Klopf, D. W., & Rives, S. G. (1967). Individual speaking contents: Preparation for participation. Burgess.
- Klopf, D. W., & Thompson, C. A. (1992). Communication in the multicultural classroom. Burgess International Group.

=== Articles ===
- Bruneau, T. J., Cambra, R. E., & Klopf, D. W. (1980). Communication apprehension: Its incidence in Guam and elsewhere. Communication: Journal of the Communication Association of the Pacific, 9(2), 46–52.
- Bruneau, T. J., Cambra, R. E., & Klopf, D. W. (1980). The interpersonal needs of Guam college students as compared to those elsewhere. Communication: Journal of the Communication Association of the Pacific, 9(1), 204–209.
- Cambra, R. E., & Klopf, D. W. (1979). Further investigations of communication apprehension in Hawaii. Communication: Journal of the Communication Association of the Pacific, 8(1), 44–51.
- Cooke, P. A., Klopf, D. W., & Ishii, S. (1991). Perceptions of world view among Japanese and American university students: A cross‐cultural comparison. Communication Research Reports, 8(2), 81–88. https://doi.org/10.1080/08824099109359879
- Frymier, A. B., Klopf, D. W., & Ishii, S. (1990). Japanese and Americans compared on the affect orientation construct. Psychological Reports, 66(3), 985–986. https://doi.org/10.2466/pr0.1990.66.3.985
- Frymier, A. B., Klopf, D. W., & Ishii, S. (1990). Affect orientation: Japanese compared to Americans. Communication Research Reports, 7(1), 63–66. https://doi.org/10.1080/08824099009359856
- Ishii, S., & Klopf, D. W. (1976). A comparison of communication activities of Japanese and American adults. ELEC Bulletin, 53, 22–26.
- Ishii, S., Klopf, D. W., & Cooke, P. A. (2012). Worldview in intercultural communication: A religio-cosmological approach. In L. A. Samovar, R. E. Porter, & E. R. McDaniel (Eds.), Intercultural communication: A reader (13th ed., pp. 56–64). Wadsworth/Cengage Learning.
- Klopf, D. W. (1972). The process of speech communication. Communication: Journal of the Communication Association of the Pacific, 1(1), 33–39.
- Klopf, D. W. (1977). Business and professional communication in Hawaii. Speech Education: Journal of the Communication Association of the Pacific, 5, 79–86.
- Klopf, D. W. (1981). Communicating across cultures: Understanding the basic elements. Korea Journal, 21(10), 11–24.
- Klopf, D. W. (1983). The intercultural perspective on human communication. Communication: Journal of the Communication Association of the Pacific, 12(3), 1–14.
- Klopf, D. W. (1984). Cross-cultural apprehension research: A summary of Pacific Basin studies. In J. A. Daly & J. C. McCroskey (Eds.), Avoiding communication: Shyness, reticence, and communication apprehension (pp. 157–169). Sage.
- Klopf, D. W. (1991). Japanese communication practices: Recent comparative research. Communication Quarterly, 39(2), 130–143. https://doi.org/10.1080/01463379109369791
- Klopf, D. W. (Ed.). (1992). Communication practices in the Pacific Basin [Special section]. Communication Quarterly, 40(4), 368–421. https://doi.org/10.1080/01463379209369853
- Klopf, D. W. (2009). Cross-cultural communication apprehension research. In J. A. Daly, J. C. McCroskey, J. Ayres, T. Hopf, D. M. Ayres Sonandre, & T. K. Wongprasert (Eds.), Avoiding communication: Shyness, reticence, and communication apprehension (3rd ed., pp. 241–253). Hampton Press.
- Klopf, D. W., & Cambra, R. E. (1979). Communication apprehension among college students in America, Australia, Japan, and Korea. Journal of Psychology, 102(1), 27–31. https://doi.org/10.1080/00223980.1979.9915091
- Klopf, D. W., & Park, M.-S. (1992). Korean communication practices: Comparative research. Korea Journal, 32(1), 93–99.
- Prunty, A. M., Klopf, D. W., & Ishii, S. (1990). Argumentativeness: Japanese and American tendencies to approach and avoid conflict. Communication Research Reports, 7(1), 75–79. https://doi.org/10.1080/08824099009359858
- Thompson, C. A., & Klopf, D. W. (1991). An analysis of social style among disparate cultures. Communication Research Reports, 8(1), 65–72. https://doi.org/10.1080/08824099109359877
- Thompson, C. A., Klopf, D. W., & Ishii, S. (1991). A comparison of social style between Japanese and Americans. Communication Research Reports, 8(2), 165–172. https://doi.org/10.1080/08824099109359889
