= Social judgment theory =

Self-persuasion theory

In social psychology, social judgment theory (SJT) is a self-persuasion theory proposing that an individual's perception and evaluation of an idea is by comparing it with current attitudes. According to this theory, an individual weighs every new idea, comparing it with the individual's present point of view to determine where it should be placed on the attitude scale in an individual's mind. SJT is the subconscious sorting out of ideas that occurs at the instant of perception. The theory of Social Judgement attempts to explain why and how people have different reactions and responses toward the same information or issue. Social Judgment Theory can be used to improve the way people communicate with one another. The theory is also widely considered in persuasions. The Social Judgement Theory depends on the individual's position on a certain issue occurring. Depending on three elements Social Judgement Theory has, they are followed by their anchor, alternatives and ego-involvement.

== Overview ==
Social judgment theory is a framework that studies human judgment. It is how people's current attitudes shape the development of sharing and communicating information. The psychophysical principle involved for example, is when a stimulus is farther away from one's judgmental anchor, a contrast effect is highly possible; when the stimulus is close to the anchor, an assimilation effect can happen. Social judgment theory represents an attempt to generalize psychophysical judgmental principles and the findings to the social judgment. With the person's preferred position serving as the judgmental anchor, SJT is a theory that mainly focuses on the internal processes of a person's own judgment in regards to the relation within a communicated message. The concept was intended to be an explanatory method designed to detail when persuasive messages are most likely to succeed.

Originally conceived as an explanatory method, SJT seeks to unravel the intricacies of persuasive communication, honing in on attitude change as its central objective. Within this theoretical framework, the conditions conducive to successful attitude change become focal points of investigation. SJT not only aims to predict the occurrence of attitude change but also endeavors to delineate the direction and magnitude of these shifts. This multifaceted approach involves an exploration of individuals' propensity to alter their opinions, the anticipated trajectory of such changes, their receptiveness to the opinions of others, and the depth of commitment to their existing positions.

Attitude change is the fundamental objective of persuasive communication. SJT seeks to specify the conditions under which this change takes place and predict the direction and extent of the attitude change, while attempting to explain how likely a person might be to change their opinion, the probable direction of that change, their tolerance toward the opinion of others, and their level of commitment to their position. The SJT researchers claimed expectations regarding attitude change could be based on the message receiver's level of involvement, the structure of the stimulus (and how many alternatives it allows), and the value (credibility) of the source.

== Founder of Social judgment theory ==
=== Muzafer Sherif ===
Muzafer Sherif, a Turkish native born into a Muslim family in 1906, studied at a Christian school. Sherif attributes his understanding and fascination with social movements in emerging African and Asian countries to the nationalistic movements in his youth in the former Ottoman Empire. Sherif obtained his Master's Degree in psychology from Harvard University in February 1932. Sherif then acquired a Ph.D. from Columbia University. Sherif was fluent in German and French, but throughout the years, he relied on English more. Sherif sympathized with the political left.

=== Roger Nebergall ===
Roger Nebergall, from Iowa, was a speech professor. He was a co-author of the book Attitude and Attitude Change: The Social Judgement- Involvement Approach alongside Muzafer Sherif. As they worked with each other they found that the Social Judgement Theory suggests an individual's position on certain issues depending on the three factors: anchor, alternatives, and ego-involvement.

== Development ==
SJT arose from social psychology and was based on laboratory findings resulting from experiments. These experiments studied the mental assessment of physical objects, referred to at the time as psychophysical research. Subjects were asked to compare some aspect of an object, such as weight or color, to another, different object. The researchers discovered that, when a standard was provided for comparison, the participants categorized the objects relative to the aspects of the standard. SJT focuses on the conceptual structure of the framework and traces its development from the roots in Brunswik's probabilistic functionalism to its present form. For example, if a very heavy object was used as the standard in assessing weight, then the other objects would be judged to be relatively lighter than if a very light object was used as the standard. The standard is referred to as an "anchor". This work involving physical objects was applied to psychosocial work, in which a participant's limits of acceptability on social issues are studied. Social issues include areas such as religion and politics.

The traditional view of attitude neglects an individual's emotional and motivational influences as well as the social context in which the attitude(s) are formed, meaning an individual is more likely to assume a speaker with authority will be informative, truthful, relevant, and clear. Wyer and Gruenfeld (1995) noted that "much of our theoretical and empirical knowledge about social information processing has been obtained under laboratory conditions that only faintly resemble the social situations in which information is usually acquired in everyday life".

== Judgment process and attitudes ==
Rooted in judgment theory, which is concerned with the discrimination and categorization of stimuli, it attempts to explain how attitudes are expressed, judged, and modified. A judgment occurs when a person compares at least two stimuli and makes a choice about them. With regard to social stimuli specifically, judgment processes incorporate both past experiences and present circumstances. Sherif et al. (1965) defined attitudes as "the stands the individual upholds and cherishes about objects, issues, persons, groups, or institutions" (p. 4). Researchers must infer attitudes from behavior. The behavior can be in response to arranged or naturally occurring stimuli. True attitudes are fundamental to self-identity and are complex, and thus can be difficult to change.

One of the ways in which the SJT developers observed attitudes was through the "Own Categories Questionnaire". This method requires research participants to place statements into piles of most acceptable, most offensive, neutral, and so on, in order for researchers to infer their attitudes. This categorization, an observable judgment process, was seen by Sherif and Hovland (1961) as a major component of attitude formation. As a judgment process, categorization and attitude formation are a product of recurring instances, so that past experiences influence decisions regarding aspects of the current situation. Therefore, attitudes are acquired.

The theory has three strict factors that create different positions an individual can have on a specific issue. Social Judgement Theory is the way opinions and thoughts are formed on specific issues or beliefs. It is used to explain the reasoning behind why and how people have different reactions and responses towards information or any specific issue. Social Judgement Theory is influenced by the values of individuals and the environments they are in or around.

The following are some ways that SJT can be used in the context of social norms campaigns that target risky behaviors like drinking, smoking, and engaging in hazardous activities:

According to SJT, people should evaluate incoming messages in light of their preexisting attitudes and convictions. Perceptual contrast is a useful tool for campaigns that draw attention to the discrepancy between perceived and actual norms. For instance, the campaign can highlight this contrast to dispel misconceptions if people think that "everyone smokes at parties," but in reality, the majority of guests rarely smoke. SJT emphasizes the significance of anchor points, or reference points, in people's decision-making processes.

Campaigns can offer relatable and unambiguous reference points to help people form their own opinions about social norms. For example, presenting anecdotes or data regarding abstainers of alcohol or tobacco use can act as anchor points to solidify this idea.

Social judgment theory suggests that individuals assess incoming information based on their preexisting attitudes and beliefs, ultimately shaping their judgments and decisions.

== Latitudes of rejection, acceptance, and noncommitment ==
Social judgment theory also illustrates how people contrast their personal positions on issues to others' positions around them. Aside from having their personal opinion, individuals hold latitudes of what they think is acceptable or unacceptable in general for other people's view. Social attitudes are not cumulative, especially regarding issues where the attitude is extreme. This means that a person may not agree with less extreme stands relative to his or her position, even though they may be in the same direction. Furthermore, even though two people may seem to hold identical attitudes, their "most preferred" and "least preferred" alternatives may differ. Thus, a person's full attitude can only be understood in terms of what other positions he or she finds acceptable or unacceptable, in addition to his or her own stand. The three factors people have towards an issue are broken up into three different latitudes: rejection, acceptance, and non-commitment. The latitude of acceptance refers to the range of ideas that an individual finds acceptable or favorable. This could vary between ideas, messages, or positions. Usually, the messages that fall within this range are more likely to be accepted and incorporated into an individual's existing beliefs.

The latitude of rejection is quite the opposite. Latitude of rejection represents the range of ideas that an individual finds unacceptable or unfavorable. The messages that end up falling within this range are most likely to be rejected.

The latitude of non-commitment lies between the middle of the latitudes of acceptance and the latitude of rejection. This is where the individual is indifferent or noncommittal. The messages in the range of non-commitment are neither accepted nor rejected by an individual. The three factors show how the attitude of an individual is imagined as a spectrum of different opinions. Showing that one accepts, ranging from rejection on one end and acceptance on the other end.

These degrees or latitudes together create the full spectrum of an individual's attitude. Sherif and Hovland (1961) define the latitude of acceptance as "the range of positions on an issue ... an individual considers acceptable to him (including the one 'most acceptable' to him)" (p. 129). On the opposite end of the continuum lies the latitude of rejection. This is defined as including the "positions he finds objectionable (including the one 'most objectionable' to him)". This latitude of rejection was deemed essential by the SJT developers in determining an individual's level of involvement and, thus, his or her propensity to an attitude change. The greater the rejection latitude, the more involved the individual is in the issue and, thus, harder to persuade.

In the middle of these opposites lies the latitude of noncommitment, a range of viewpoints where one feels primarily indifferent. Sherif claimed that the greater the discrepancy, the more listeners will adjust their attitudes. Thus, the message that persuades the most is the one that is most discrepant from the listener's position, yet falls within his or her latitude of acceptance or latitude of noncommitment.

Social judgment theory (SJT) is applied in "Kinky Boots," as seen in a number of story points. Firstly, the concepts of SJT's latitude of acceptance, rejection, and noncommitment are reflected in the characters' attitudes and responses to outlandish concepts, such as the creation of durable yet stylish boots for drag queens. Charlie, the main character, first finds it difficult to embrace this new course for his family's failing shoe factory, illustrating the difficulties in broadening one's acceptance range. The interactions between the characters also emphasize how SJT shapes people's attitudes and actions. In the narrative, Lola, the drag queen who works with Charlie, experiences differing degrees of acceptance and rejection from various people, demonstrating how people's opinions are shaped by their preconceived notions. Furthermore, as characters like Charlie and Lola go through personal journeys of overcoming societal expectations and embracing their authentic selves, the theme of self-acceptance is central to the plot. This examination of self-acceptance aligns with SJT's focus on how people internalize social norms and how that affects how they behave.

All things considered, "Kinky Boots" offers a wealth of illustrations that show how social judgment theory functions within the framework of social norms, personal identity, and interpersonal relationships. The musical provides insights into the intricacies of human judgment and the transformational potential of acceptance through its gripping story.

== Assimilation and contrast ==
Sometimes people perceive a message that falls within their latitude of rejection as farther from their anchor than it really is; a phenomenon known as contrast. The opposite of contrast is assimilation, a perceptual error whereby people judge messages that fall within their latitude of acceptance as less discrepant from their anchor than they really are.

These latitudes dictate the likelihood of assimilation and contrast. When a discrepant viewpoint is expressed in a communication message within the person's latitude of acceptance, the message is more likely to be assimilated or viewed as being closer to the person's anchor, or his or her own viewpoint, than it actually is. When the message is perceived as being very different from one's anchor and, thus, falling within the latitude of rejection, persuasion is unlikely, due to a contrast effect. The contrast effect is what happens when the message is viewed as being further away than it actually is from the anchor.

Messages falling within the latitude of non-commitment, however, are the ones most likely to achieve the desired attitude change. Therefore, the more extreme an individual's stance, the greater his or her latitude of rejection and, thus, the harder he or she is to persuade.

== Ego involvement ==
The SJT researchers speculated that extreme stands, and thus wide latitudes of rejection, were a result of high ego involvement. Ego involvement is the importance or centrality of an issue to a person's life, often demonstrated by membership in a group with a known stand. According to the 1961 Sherif and Hovland work, the level of ego involvement depends upon whether the issue "arouses an intense attitude or, rather, whether the individual can regard the issue with some detachment as primarily a 'factual' matter" (p. 191). Religion, politics, and family are examples of issues that typically result in highly involved attitudes. They contribute to one's self-identity.

The concept of involvement is the crux of SJT. In short, Sherif et al. (1965) speculated that individuals who are highly involved in an issue are more likely to evaluate all possible positions, therefore resulting in an extremely limited or nonexistent latitude of non-commitment. People who have a deep concern or have extreme opinions on either side of the argument always care deeply and have a large latitude of rejection because they already have their strong opinion formed and usually are not willing to change that. High involvement also means that individuals will have a more restricted latitude of acceptance. According to SJT, messages falling within the latitude of rejection are unlikely to successfully persuade. Therefore, highly involved individuals will be harder to persuade, according to SJT.

In opposition, individuals who have less care in the issue, or have a smaller ego involvement, are likely to have a large latitude of acceptance. Because they are less educated and do not care as much about the issue, they are more likely to easily accept more ideas or opinions about an issue. This individual will also have a large latitude of non-commitment because, again, if they do not care as much about the topic, they are not going to commit to certain ideas, whether they are on the latitude of rejection or acceptance. An individual who does not have much ego involvement in an issue will have a small latitude of rejection because they are very open to this new issue and do not have previously formed opinions about it.

== Attitude change ==
To change an attitude, we must first understand the audience's attitudes. Positive attitude change increases as the discrepancy goes up. Then we will see how it relates to the listeners' judgments of the persuasive messages. It is also essential to judge how close or far away one's position is. The next step is to shift one's position in response to the argument made. An individual adjusts an attitude once he or she has judged a new position to be in his or her latitude of acceptance. If someone judges that message to be in his or her latitude of rejection, they will also adjust their attitude, but in the opposite direction from what they think the speaker is advocating.

Sometimes, an attitude change may be incidental. In the boomerang effect, an attitude changes in the opposite direction from what the message advocates—the listener is driven away from, rather than drawn to, an idea. This explains why oftentimes fear appeals used in advertising do not work on the audience. As the threat perceived by the audience increases and the capacity to produce the desired effect is low, people will tend to do the opposite of what is advocated. Attitude change can also be influenced by the immediate social environment. In the interpersonal domain, people tend to shift their attitudes to align with those of their significant others. The general picture of social influence thus remains one of conformity and alignment attitudes. A major implication of social judgment theory is that persuasion is difficult to accomplish. Successful persuasive messages are those that are targeted to the receiver's latitude of acceptance and discrepant from the anchor position so that the incoming information cannot be assimilated or contrasted. This suggests that even successful attempts at persuasion will yield only small changes in attitude. SJT also suggests persuasion can occur over time with multiple messages.

Central to this process is the concept of the "latitude of acceptance." Individuals are inclined to modify their attitudes when they perceive a novel position falling within this latitude. Conversely, if a message is deemed to be within the "latitude of rejection," the audience may still undergo an attitude adjustment, but in the opposite direction of the advocated stance.

A significant implication emerges from the social judgment theory: the arduous nature of persuasion. Successful persuasive messages must be finely tuned to the receiver's latitude of acceptance and strategically discrepant from the anchor position. Even in cases of successful persuasion, the anticipated changes in attitude may be modest. Furthermore, the theory suggests that persuasion is not a one-time event but a cumulative process, with attitudes potentially evolving over time through exposure to multiple messages.

== Simulations ==
SJT has mainly been tested in small experimental settings, only rarely in more extended ways that include an investigation of opinion changes on a collective level in modeling studies. Stefanelli and Seidel conducted a large-scale simulation of SJT, based on real-life data. They collected survey data from 1302 Swiss citizens, regarding their attitudes towards building a deep-ground-repository for nuclear waste. Attitudes were ranked on three scales: risk, benefit, and process. The data was fed into an agent-based social simulation. In each time period, two random agents were selected to interact. Their opinions on these three topics (risk, benefit, and process) were compared. If they were in the latitude of rejection, the opinions were pushed away from each other; otherwise, the opinions were pulled towards each other. The results showed a four-opinion cluster solution, representing four types of opinions: opposing, supporting, ambivalent, and indifferent.

Their study unfolded as a substantial simulation rooted in the attitudes of 1302 Swiss citizens toward the construction of a deep-ground repository for nuclear waste. The participants' attitudes were gauged across three dimensions: risk, benefit, and process. This rich dataset was then utilized in an agent-based social simulation, introducing a dynamic element to the study.

The outcome of this intricate simulation revealed a fascinating four-opinion cluster solution. This cluster represented distinct types of opinions held by the participants: opposing, supporting, ambivalent, and indifferent. This nuanced categorization underscores the complexity of collective opinions and how they evolve within the framework of SJT. The study by Stefanelli and Seidel not only expanded the application of SJT beyond controlled settings but also provided insights into the diverse manifestations of opinions within a real-world context.

== Studies utilizing SJT ==
A recent study by Melike Acar uses SJT to evaluate Turkish teachers' social judgments on students with special needs being excluded and included in primary schools. This study's main purpose was to research teachers' decisions and justifications related to students with autism and how some teachers struggle to include students with special needs. This study discusses the difficulties in having relations with children in both mainstream and special needs schools. One can see the perspectives of teachers regarding the exclusion of students with different needs. The study goes into depth about how social judgment theory affects both exclusive and inclusive special needs schools. The results concluded that teachers with more training on inclusion had a more positive acceptance than teachers who had not had the training when it came to games. However, when it came to school projects, those who had not had the inclusion training were more excepting than those who had the training. Fifty-four teachers participated in the study.

Another study from 2021 by Yao Song, Ameersing Luximon, and Yan Luximon studied the effects of different human-robot faces and whether or not people trust them. Experiments showed that big eyes, medium vertical and horizontal eye position, and medium horizontal mouth position all helped to increase trustworthiness. To be able to receive a latitude of acceptance from the social judgment theory of people, they experimented with people's reactions to different facial features on robots.

Another study conducted by Agbolagh and Zamani examined SJT in simulations and its connections to balance theory. Results indicate that in a given group of people, opinions will tend to either cluster or form consensus or bipartite consensus when beliefs begin to form into two groups in a community. Interactions among those within a group remain largely positive, while those between groups are negative. Findings suggest once the bounded confidence model was adapted to include negative responses, those with like-minded opinions had a higher likelihood of persuading. Findings of this study indicate that opinions changed to align with the average view of trusted individuals among participants.

An Ohio State University tested the study participants' moral judgment of characters in media through the lens of SJT. The study findings indicate that during interactions between heroes and villains, people morally disengage from the violence committed by the hero because they know the villain to be morally worse. Because of their past experiences in observing heroes in media, people are inclined to believe that the hero is acting in a way that is less immoral because of their preconceived notions of who a hero is. A reason for this may indicate that the hero committed violence to stop the villain. This moral disengagement occurs between the boundaries of their latitudes of rejection and acceptance.

An early study utilizing SJT from 1966 by Bochner and Insko, students read an "expert" article about how much sleep young people truly need in a night, and then were surveyed about how much sleep they believed they needed. Most students came into the study with the knowledge that 7-8 hours of sleep each night constitutes a good night's rest. The difference between the articles the students read was the amount of sleep recommended ranging from 8 to 0 hours each night. Persuasion increased as the recommended amount of sleep lowered until it was reduced to 3 hours. At that point, students gradually stopped believing the article given to them. This study shows the students' latitude of acceptance on the topic ranged between 8 and about 3 hours. While within the latitude of acceptance, persuasion increased the more radical the idea presented was. But once the latitude of acceptance was hit, persuasion starkly decreased.

A study done in 2020 used SJT to research the viewpoint Israeli Jews held about African refugees and asylum seekers in Israel. It was found that extreme messaging was most effective in influencing social judgements in Israeli Jews about African refugees compared to moderate or very extreme messaging. When moderate messaging was used, views were not moved far from their anchor. When too extreme messaging was used, it fell out of the receiver's latitude of acceptance, and the receiver completely disregarded the message. The most impact was found when a middle ground message was used.

In a study done concerning teenagers attending alternative high schools, students reported a statistically significantly latitude of acceptance around substances positively correlated to past gateway drug use and future hard drug use. SJT helps to explain why the latitude of acceptance around substances is important. The higher the latitude of acceptance around substances, the more open a person is to trying said substance. The study proposes that in order to reduce substance abuse rates overall, having programs to reduce the latitude of acceptance around substances in teens is a potential solution.

Concerning online shopping data privacy, a 2020 study researched how perceived warmth in online shopping relates to personal disclosure from the customer. It was found that customers perceived a higher level of warmth and a lower level of privacy concerns when asked to disclose information (such as their phone number, email address, and home address) towards the end of the online shopping interaction as opposed to right away. This makes customers more likely to disclose information towards the purchase or post-purchase phases of shopping. Perceived warmth can persuade customers into giving out personal information. Companies can use this to establish warmth within their online presences.

One study by Goglia and Vega analyzed social interaction in Reddit communities, specifically subreddits where the original poster asks for judgement from the community on a certain issue. Using the lens of SJT, the study underlines the importance of previous responses read before a user is to add their own comment/opinion. Users are often persuaded by comments from other users before making their final judgement on the original post.

In a study done in 2019, Florida residents were surveyed about their opinions on genetically modified foods. They were given messages on the topic to either accept or reject based on their beliefs. Messages that genetically modified foods had no health effects on humans at all and messages that genetically modified foods caused cancer were most often rejected. Messages that stated genetically modified food carried some health risk to humans were most often accepted. This study shows where the common latitudes of rejection and acceptance on the topic lie within the population surveyed.

== Conservatism of COVID-19 ==
The concept of conservatism and the political spectrum have a strong connection to the anti-vaccine sentiments observed in social judgment theory. In order to lessen anti-vaccination sentiments, people's perceptions of attitude change from acceptance to rejection, and intellectual humility can either narrow or widen their latitudes of rejection and acceptance. Anti-vaccination sentiments included disapproval of vaccines for a number of different causes. The four most common reasons are doubts about the effectiveness of vaccines, worries about possible adverse effects, and references to or beliefs about the superiority of natural immunity over vaccinations from pharmaceutical corporations, which earn huge profits from vaccinations. These four categories of anti-vaccine sentiments, which are not all-inclusive, sum up the main causes of anti-vaccine sentiment in the general public. In terms of vaccine and mask mandates these violations of one's freedom, particularly over a topic that has a high degree of ego involvement, would likely lead to the anchoring of one's attitude about vaccinations within the latitude of rejection. It's hardly surprising that social judgment—especially with regard to vaccination attitudes—plays a big part in the COVID-19 pandemic. Tweets and other social media content can give important information about how the general public feels, thinks, and behaves in relation to vaccination campaigns. In order to gauge public opinion, spot new trends, and evaluate the effectiveness of communication tactics, researchers and public health specialists frequently examine social media data, including tweets. Researchers can learn about a variety of factors influencing people's opinions, including misinformation, personal experiences, cultural beliefs, and political ideologies, by looking at tweets about vaccines. But it's crucial to proceed cautiously when analyzing social media data and to be aware of the presumptions that underlie this kind of study.

== Memory Decline and Vulnerability to Misinformation in Older Adults ==
Memory decline in older adults is well documented. Research indicates that older individuals are more likely to generate false memories and are generally more prone to memory distortions than younger adults. This susceptibility affects their ability to judge what information is accurate. Age-related memory challenges hinder older adults from evaluating the authenticity, source, or context of digital content, including information influenced by artificial intelligence. 60-70% of adults aged 50 and over found that a majority would have little or no confidence in distinguishing health-related misinformation generated by AI, especially among those reporting fair or poor memory or health.

Older adults may also be less aware of or familiar with advanced digital deception technologies such as deepfakes, placing them at increased risk of being misled by AI-generated media. Research indicates that a significant portion of people aged 55 and older had never heard of deepfakes, and they were substantially less likely to correctly identify deepfake videos compared with static images. Research exploring older adults’ experiences with misinformation highlights that this demographic is more likely to both accept and spread false information during periods of information overload. Contributing factors include lower digital literacy and limited exposure to deceptive online content formats.

To address these challenges, research has investigated technological and educational strategies to support older adults in managing misinformation. Participatory research on chatbot design suggests that conversational AI tools could help older users navigate misinformation by offering guidance and facilitating their information-evaluation skills. Given the prevalence of AI-assisted scams and fraud concerns among older adults, combining digital literacy education, clear signaling of credible sources, and supportive tools may improve their capacity to discern AI-generated content and make informed decisions.

== Conclusion ==
Though its integration with other psychological theories is still restricted, Social Judgment Theory has made a substantial contribution to our understanding of how people assess and react to persuasive communication. Combining SJT with dual-process theories of persuasion, such the Elaboration Likelihood Model (ELM) created by Petty and Cacioppo, is one prospective avenue for growth. SJT's ideas of latitudes of acceptance, rejection, and noncommitment may have significant intersections with these models, which distinguish between central and peripheral processing pathways.For example, people's latitude of acceptance may increase when they are strongly motivated and have the capacity to digest a message, which increases the possibility that their attitude may change. Even with this theoretical overlap, there are currently not many empirical research examining how these models work together, especially in applied situations like digital environments, political speech, or health communication.

The use of SJT in group dynamics and intergroup communication is another unexplored field of study. Sherif, M., Harvey, O. J., White, B. J., Hood, W. R., & Sherif, C. W. (1961) set the groundwork for the first work on intergroup conflict by Muzafer Sherif and associates. Cooperation and conflict amongst groups: The Robbers Cave experiment. University Book Exchange, Norman, OK. Subsequent studies have mostly concentrated on mechanisms at the individual level. This restricts our ability to comprehend how shared latitudes of acceptance or rejection might function among social movements, political alliances, or online communities, among other groups. Examining how group identity affects persuasive communications' perceived acceptability or trustworthiness could provide fresh perspectives on issues like polarization and the dissemination of false information in online echo chambers.

Nothing is known about how broadly applicable Social Judgment Theory is across cultural boundaries. In Western, individualistic society, where views are seen as internally driven and privately held, the majority of study has been carried out. On the other hand, civilizations that value social peace and community consensus, known as collectivist societies, could display distinct evaluative judgment patterns. To prevent conflict or maintain group cohesiveness, for example, people in certain situations might retain wider latitudes of noncommitment. If SJT needs to be expanded or modified to better represent worldwide differences in persuasive communication and judgment, cross-cultural research may be able to help.

An evaluation of the social judgment theory in light of several standards that define a sound scientific theory is presented in the final part. A good theory should first and foremost be consistent with the available data. It should, in theory, summarize and explain a certain collection of information and events. These veracity criteria are where social judgment theory performs rather well. It has been based on empirical data from the beginning and has been successful in absorbing a significant number of known facts. Not everyone has the same upbeat opinion. While the discrepancy debate suggests that social judgment theory is somewhat broad, there are at least some situations at which it is unmistakably false. For example, the theory would not be able to handle an anomaly when contrast happened at a tiny discrepancy and assimilation at a huge discrepancy. Similarly, the theory would not be able to elegantly include such a set of facts if there were a U-shaped function between disagreement and opinion change in response to a communication. However, this theory has a number of valuable concepts and ideas, as well as a number of areas that may be studied further within the framework of this theory. When the growing body of information is examined, the hypothesis is expanded upon, and any necessary revisions are made.

== Alternative models ==
- Elaboration likelihood model – emphasizes the two routes of persuasion – central (cognitive arguments) and peripheral (emotional influence).
- Social impact theory – emphasizes the number, strength, and immediacy of the people trying to influence a person to change their mind.
- Error parsing – an alternative method of implementing social judgment theory. Error Parsing focuses on errors that can occur with SJT, such as human error, error due to noise, error due to cue weighting and error due to inconsistency.
