= Private speech =

Speech spoken to oneself

Private speech is speech spoken to oneself. It can be done for communication, self-guidance, and behavioral self-regulation. Children have been observed engaging in private speech between ages two and seven. Although audible, private speech is neither intended for, nor directed at, others. Private speech was first studied by Lev Vygotsky and Jean Piaget. In the past 30 years, private speech has received renewed attention from researchers. Researchers have noted a positive correlation between children's use of private speech and their task performance and achievement, a fact also noted previously by Vygotsky. It is when children begin school that their use of private speech decreases and "goes underground".

== History and theory ==
Private speech is typically observed in children from about two to seven years old. Private speech or "self-talk" is observed speech spoken to oneself for communication, self-guidance, and self-regulation of behaviour. Private speech is often thought to enhance developing early literacy skills and help increase a child's task performance, success, and achievement. Numerous sources trace the first theories of private speech back to two early well-known developmental psychologists, Vygotsky and Piaget. Both of these psychologists mainly studied private speech in young children, but they had differing perspectives and terminology.

In 1923, Piaget published The Language and Thought of the Child. In this book he recorded his observations of children talking to themselves in classrooms and termed it as "egocentric speech", the earliest concept of private speech. For Piaget, egocentric speech was a sign of cognitive immaturity. He thought egocentric speech would later develop into a fully mature and effective speech after a child gains a fair amount of cognitive and communicative skills.

In Thought and Language, Vygotsky argued that egocentric speech was a part of normal development of communication, self-guidance, self-regulation of behaviour, planning, pacing, and monitoring skills. Vygotsky explains that private speech stems from a child's social interactions as a toddler, then reaches a peak during preschool or kindergarten when children talk aloud to themselves. Private speech serves as "the social/cultural tool or symbol system of language, first used for interpersonal communication but later employed by the child overtly for intrapersonal communication and self-guidance." Private speech decreases during late elementary school years as children transition to using inner speech.

Vygotsky's theory of private speech has been considered significant by more recent developmental psychologists and has served as a basis for research for over 75 years. Berk, Winsler, Diaz, Montero, Neal, Amaya-Williams, and Wertsch are amongst some of the current well-known developmental psychologists and researchers who have been specializing in the field of private speech. Although the concept dates back to the 1930s, private speech is still an emerging field in psychology with a vast amount of research opportunities.

== Benefits and uses for children ==
Evidence has supported Vygotsky's theory that private speech provides many developmental benefits for children. Above all, private speech aids children in different types of self-guidance and self-regulation. More specific uses and benefits of private speech are listed below.

=== Behavioral self-regulation and emotion regulation ===
Young children's behaviors are strongly influenced by the environment. For instance, the presence of an interesting new toy in the preschool classroom is likely to draw a child's attention and influence his or her play. Private speech helps children to verbally guide their own behavior and attention by helping them to detach themselves from stimuli in their environment. As private speech is very important for children to engage in at early ages, this speech should not be interrupted or limited by parental control. For example, a child may use private speech to direct themselves away from the distracting toy and toward the activity that the teacher told the child to do. Thus, private speech helps children to be less strongly influenced by their immediate environment and instead to self-control their behavior.

The relationship between private speech and behavioral self-regulation is further demonstrated by research showing that children use more private speech when asked to do more difficult tasks or when asked to do tasks without the help of a teacher or parent. In other words, in circumstances when more behavioral self-regulation is required of a young child, the child is more likely to use private speech. Private speech has also been linked to three-year-old's' ability to engage in task-related goals when explicitly taught to use private speech as a strategy for this purpose.

Young children also use private speech to help them regulate their emotions. One way that children regulate their emotions and comfort themselves through private speech is by mimicking their parents' comforting speech. For instance, a child may help themself calm down for sleep by repeating nighttime phrases that their parents have said to them previously to calm down. Young children who are better at controlling their emotions have also shown an increase in the amount of private speech they use.

=== Memory, motivation, communication, and creativity ===
Private speech is used by children spontaneously and is a learned strategy to enhance memory. Private speech is used as a repetitive strategy, to enhance working memory by maintaining information to be remembered. For instance, a child might repeat a rule or story to themselves in order to remember it. Children also use private speech to aid their ability to suppress certain responses or information, and instead use other, less common responses or information, a process known as inhibitory control.

By expressing goals, opinions, feelings, and self-thoughts through private speech, private speech increases children's motivation. For instance, a child may talk themselves through a challenging task. This type of motivating private speech is associated with self-efficacy. Moreover, children have been observed using motivational private speech especially during difficult tasks, and using motivational private speech is related to improved outcomes on the task.

Some researchers have hypothesized that private speech helps young children to master speech communication, by immersing themselves in speech more than they could with others. In doing so, children gain insight about their own communication abilities, practice communication, and build effective speech and communication skills.

Children often use private speech during creative and imaginative play. For instance, children often talk to themselves when playing imaginative and pretend games. Private speech is related to more creative play – the more frequently children engage in private speech, the more creative, flexible, and original thought they display.

== Research ==
Current research is becoming focused on use of private speech in the early childhood classroom setting and teachers' practices and attitudes regarding children's private speech. Many studies have shown that preschool aged children engage in a considerable amount of overt private speech in their early childhood classrooms. Specifically, researchers have found that children use more self-talk when they are busy with a goal-directed task activity (e.g., completing a puzzle). It was also found that preschool aged children were least likely to use private speech in the presence of a teacher.

Many methodological advancements and tools can now be used to better examine the role of speech in self-regulation. With these advancements, there will be more research in the future on children's awareness of inner and private speech. There is also a possibility that researchers will perform additional work on the early precursors of self-talk, early childhood interventions and better understanding the role language has on the formation of inner and private speech.

== In adults ==
In a self-reported questionnaire, young adults reported high levels of private speech, particularly when engaged in tasks with cognitive, mnemonic, and attentional components. This suggests that private speech may be retained to some extent into adulthood, serving a similar purpose as it does in children. Adults who stutter are much less likely to do so during private speech.

== See also ==
- Idioglossia – language invented and spoken by only one person or very few people
- Intrapersonal communication
