= James Honeycutt =

American academic

James M. Honeycutt
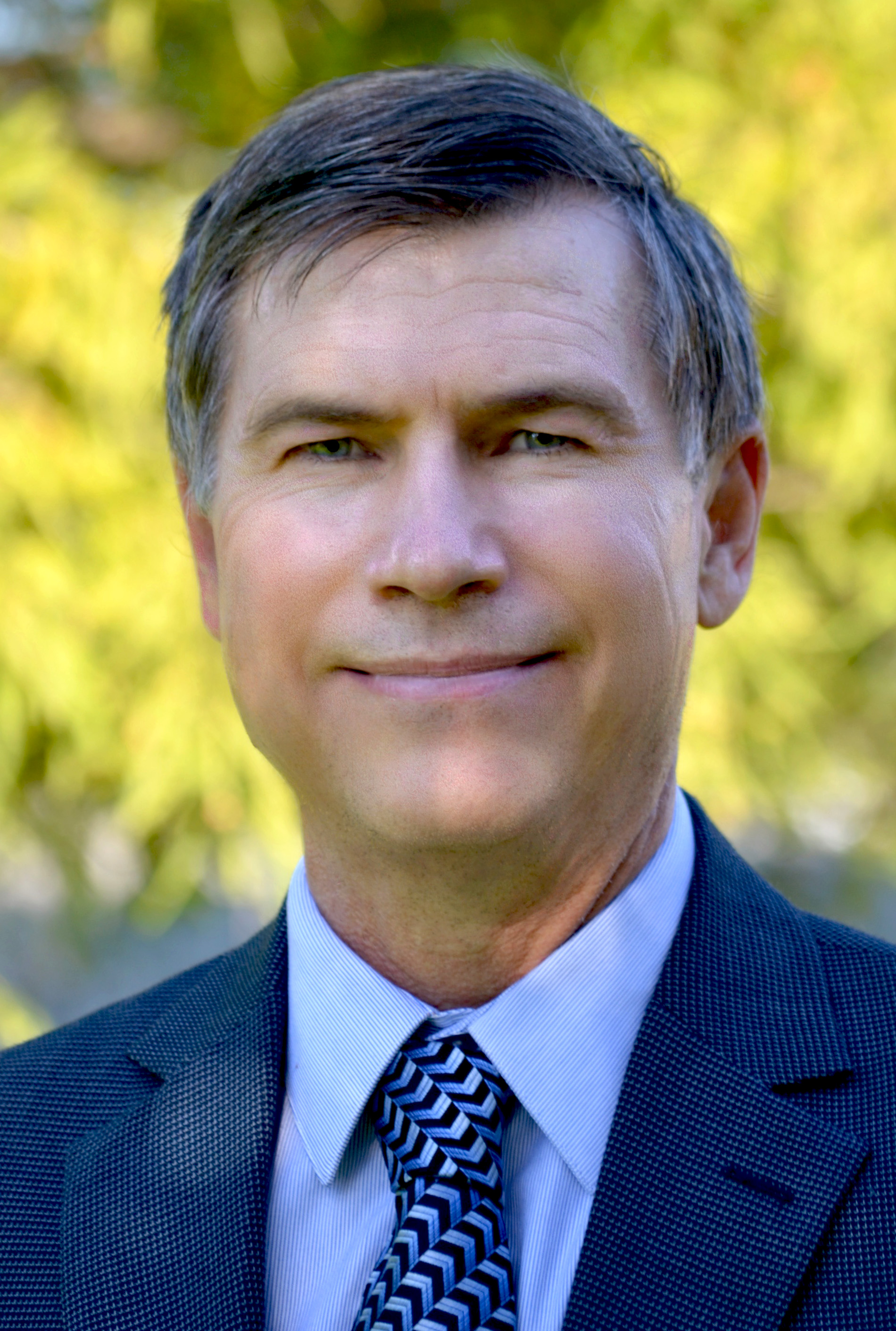
- Honeycutt in 2014
- Born: 1958 (age 67–68); Dallas, Texas, U.S.
- Occupation: Professor
- Years active: 1986–present
- Known for: Imagined Interaction Theory
- Title: Distinguished Professor Emeritus
- Spouse: Elizabeth Honeycutt

Academic background
- Education: UT-Austin (B.S.); Purdue University (M.S.)
- Alma mater: University of Illinois at Urbana–Champaign (Ph.D.)
- Thesis: An Examination of Information Processing in Initial Interaction through Linking Input, Structure, and Outcome: Effects of Preinteraction Expectancies on Interpersonal Attraction and Interaction Structure (1988)
- Doctoral advisor: Dean E. Hewes
- Other advisors: Robert W. Norton, Master's Thesis; Robert Hopper, Undergraduate Thesis, UT-Austin

Academic work
- Discipline: Interpersonal Communication
- Sub-discipline: Social Cognition
- Institutions: Louisiana State University
- Main interests: Imagined Interactions, Conflict-Linkage, Relational Communication, Biological Basis of Communication, Signaling Theory, Music Therapy
- Notable works: Honeycutt, James M. (2003). Imagined Interactions: Daydreaming about Communication]. Hampton Press. ISBN 1-57273-414-0.
- Website: LSU Faculty Website

James M. Honeycutt (born 1958) is an American academic who is currently a lecturer on the faculty of Organizational Behavior, Coaching, and Consulting at the UT-Dallas Naveen Jindal School of Management. A Distinguished Professor Emeritus of Communication Studies at Louisiana State University, he is best known for his Theory of Imagined Interactions (IIs). (Note: Full text available from author here.) IIs are a form of social cognition in which an individual imagines and therefore indirectly experiences themselves in anticipated and/or past communicative encounters (Note: IIs are distinct from fantasy due to their focus on actual or plausible interactions) with others. II theory appears in communication encyclopedias, handbooks and graduate and undergraduate textbooks. (Note: This undergraduate text uses simplified language. Ch.10 refers to "imagined conversations", citing Honeycutt's imagined interactions research (endnote 21). Ch.9 indicates "some research suggests that serial conflicts persist when people rehearse interactions in their minds prior to engaging in them," citing Honeycutt's II conflict-linkage research (endnote 6).)

== Early life and education ==
Honeycutt was born and raised in Dallas, Texas in 1956 to Frank and Arletha Honeycutt. (Note: See Dedication, p.vi., for parents' names.) He attended Lloyd V. Berkner High School, and graduated from UT-Austin in 1979, with a B.S. in interpersonal communication and a minor in social psychology. His honors thesis, advised by Robert Hooper, was "Matching of Interruptions, Talk Duration, Silence in Symmetrical and Complementary Dyads Based on Predispositions Toward Verbal Behavior".

Honeycutt graduated in 1981 with an M.S. in interpersonal communication with a minor in statistics and research methods from Purdue University. His Master's thesis, chaired by Robert W. Norton, was "Relative Commitment of an Individual and the Discriminability of Communicator Styles Used in the Marital Relationship". He received his Ph.D. from University of Illinois, Urbana-Champaign in 1987. His dissertation, "An Examination of Information Processing in Initial Interaction through Linking Input, Structure, and Outcome: Effects of Preinteraction Expectancies on Interpersonal Attraction and Interaction Structure", chaired by Dean E. Hewes, led tofive publications in peer-reviewed journals.

== Academic career and teaching ==
Honeycutt was hired as an assistant professor at LSU in 1986, He received tenure and was promoted to associate professor in 1991, full professor in 2001, and received the honorific Distinguished Professor in 2012. In 1998, he served briefly as a visiting professor at UCSB. He retired from LSU as distinguished professor emeritus in 2019, and returned to his hometown of Dallas, Texas where he is a lecturer at the University of Texas at Dallas.

Honeycutt founded the Matchbox Interaction Lab at LSU in 2007 where individuals, couples, and groups participating in research as subjects discuss topics which are usually promoted by researchers, who then leave the room. Researchers observe the interactions in the lab through one way glass, in addition to full audio and video recording capabilities. If the research requires physiological data, the lab has the capability to record variables like heart rate and galvanic skin response. The name "Matchbox" was coined by students because when fiery conflict interactions occur between subjects based on the researchers' prompt, it's like the researcher lit a match that "sparked" the conflict.

== Research ==
Honeycutt's original work focused on the conflict-linkage function of IIs, which explains why arguments are so persistent in interpersonal relationships. Individuals may ruminate about conflicts through recalling prior arguments while also imagining anticipated conflict in future interactions. Imagining conflict interactions not only keeps the argument fresh in the mind, but can cause physiological arousal and stress reactions. Over time, II theory has expanded to encompass other functions and has been applied in multiple contexts.

== Honors ==
He was honored as an Outstanding Scholar in Communication Theory by the Southern States Communication Association in 2013. The National Communication Association's Social Cognition Division awarded his first book on Imagined Interactions the Distinguished Book Award in 2006.

== Major research publications ==
=== Books ===
- Honeycutt, J. M. (2003). Imagined interactions: Daydreaming about communication. Cresskill, NJ: Hampton. ISBN 1-57273-413-2. Outstanding Book Award 2006 NCA
- Honeycutt, J. M. & Sheldon, P. A. (2018). Scripts and communication for relationships. 2nd edition. New York. Peter Lang. ISBN 9781433142178

=== Books edited ===
- Honeycutt, J. M. (2010) (ed.), Imagine that: Studies in imagined interaction . Cresskill, NJ: Hampton.
- Honeycutt, J. M., ed. (2019). Coping with trauma: Promoting mental health through imagery and imagined interactions York: Peter Lang.

=== Most cited peer review articles ===
- Bodie, G. D., Honeycutt, J. M., & Vickery. A. J. (2013). An analysis of the correspondence between imagined interaction attributes and functions. Human Communication Research, 39, 157–183. doi: 10.1111/hcre.12003 Top Paper NCA prior to publication
- Honeycutt, James. M.; Vickery, A. J.; & Hatcher, L. C. (2015).The daily use of imagined interaction features . Communication Monographs 82 (2): 201–223.
- Eldredge, J. H., Honeycutt, J. M., White, R. C., & Standige, M. (2016). On the functions of imagined interactions in night dreams . Imagination, Cognition, and Personality, 35, 244–257. doi:10.1177/0276236615595231
- Honeycutt, J. M. (2004). interaction conflict-linkage theory: Explaining the persistence and resolution of interpersonal conflict in everyday life [https://journals.sagepub.com/doi/abs/10.2190/240j-1vpk-k86d-1jl8 Imagination, Cognition, and Personality, 23, 3-25. doi:10.2190/240J-1VPK-K86D-1JL8. (review article)
- Honeycutt, J. M.; Sheldon, P; Pence, M. E.; & Hatcher, L. C. (2015).Predicting aggression, conciliation, and concurrent rumination in escalating conflict [https://journals.sagepub.com/doi/abs/10.1177/0886260514532717 Journal of Interpersonal Violence 30: 133–151.
- Honeycutt, J. M., Cantrill, J. G., & Greene, R. W. (1989). Memory structures for relational escalation: A cognitive test of the sequencing of relational actions and stages. . Human Communication Research, 16, 62-90. doi:10.1111/j.1468-2958.1989.tb00205.x
- Frost, J. K., Honeycutt, J. M. & Heath, S. K. (2017). Relational maintenance and social support in the aftermath of sudden and expected death. Communication Research Reports 34, 326-334. doi: 10.1080/08824096.2017.1350573
- Honeycutt, J. M.; Woods, B. L.; & Fontenot, K. (1993) The endorsement of communication conflict rules as a function of engagement, marriage, and marital ideology. Journal of Social and Personal Relationships 10 (2): 285–304. .
- Giles, H., Fortman, J., Honeycutt, J. M. & Oti, H. (2003). Future selves and others: A lifespan and cross-cultural perspective. Communication Reports, 16, 1-22. doi: 10.1080/08934210309384486
- McCann, R. M., & Honeycutt, J. M. (2006). A cross-cultural analysis of imagined interaction]. Human Communication Research, 32, 274-301.doi: 10.1111%2Fj.1468-2958.2006.00276.x
- McCann, R. M., Honeycutt, J. M., & Keaton, S. A. (2010). Toward greater specificity in cultural value analyses: The interplay of intrapersonal communication affect and cultural values in Japan, Thailand, and the United States. Journal of Intercultural Communication Research, 39, 157-172. doi:10.1080/17475759.2010.534862
- Honeycutt, J. M., & McCann, R.M. (2008). Predicting intrapersonal communication satisfaction on the basis of imagined interactions in the Pacific Rim]. Journal of Intercultural Communication Research, 37, 25-43. doi:10.1080/17475750802077362
- Honeycutt, J. M. (2020). On the correspondence between meta-emotions, cardiovascular arousal and imagined interaction discrepancy]. Evolutionary Psychological Science, 6, 82–91.
- Honeycutt, J. M., Frost, J. K., & Krawietz, C. E. (2019).Applying signal detection theory to conflict escalation as a consequence of victimization with physiological arousal covariates. Journal of Aggression, Conflict, and Peace Research. doi:10.1108/JACPR-10-2018-0386
- 2 Scholars Develop Hit Parade of Music for Couples to Argue By "2 Scholars Develop Hit Parade of Music for Couples to Argue By". www.chronicle.com. The Chronicle of Higher Education. November 20, 2000.
