= Self-persuasion =

Self-persuasion is used to explain one aspect of social influence. This theory postulates that the receiver takes an active role in persuading himself or herself to change his or her attitude. Unlike the direct technique of Persuasion, Self-persuasion is indirect and entails placing people in situations where they are motivated to persuade themselves to change. More specifically what characterizes a self-persuasion situation is that no direct attempt is made to convince anyone of anything. Thus, with self-persuasion, people are convinced that the motivation for change has come from within, so the persuasion factors of another person's influence is irrelevant. Therefore, Self-persuasion is almost always a more powerful form of persuasion (deeper, longer lasting) than the more traditional persuasion techniques. Self-Persuasion, also has an important influence in Social judgment theory, Elaboration Likelihood Model, Cognitive Dissonance and Narrative paradigm.

== History ==
Self-persuasion came about based on the more traditional or direct strategies of persuasion, which have been around for at least 2,300 years and studied by eminent social psychologists from Aristotle to Carl Hovland, they focused their attention on these three principal factors: the nature of the message, the characteristics of the communicator, and the characteristics of the audience. It wasn't until later that the theory of self-persuasion was developed by Dr. Carl Hovland, of Psychology, who had conducted studies during his time at Yale University during the 1940s and '50s. His argument in creating the concept of self-persuasion was that the factors within us determine our decision-making; for example, one's personality, self-esteem, education, or interest.

== Motivation ==
How can motivation and self-persuasion be connected? Webster defines motivation as the act or process of giving someone a reason for doing something: the act or process of motivating someone. Motivation involving self-persuasion pertains to the ability to motivate oneself for a higher reason or reward. Convincing a person to believe in your belief can be a challenge, however, trying to convince yourself is altogether another effort and challenge. Persuasion allows the mind the ability to be persuaded for reasons that exist for beneficial factors. Consider this: if you conquer your fears, would you consider this a giant feat or success? Through self-persuasion along with motivation, many people can tackle their fears, which in turn allows them to move to the next level or simply a higher level within society.

Self-persuasion permits a person's mind the ability to be influenced or persuaded if they choose to. The mind through persuasion can also deny or resist if it so chooses, regardless of self-persuasion. Self-persuasion is directly related to the processes of a person's mind and the influence of motivation the mind perceives. People would rather listen to themselves than to other people normally, except for those people who are indecisive. When people are trying to convince themselves or be persuaded into changing their minds, it can sometimes involve motivation or the act of motivation. People will listen to themselves and will automatically generate arguments that have personal relevance for them.

It might sound crazy to some people, but people are being encouraged to persuade themselves all the time. Many of these times are through motivation intensity. As people know, motivation can be a driving ambition that can easily sway people based on reward, self-persuasion through motivation can achieve great results.

Encouraging a person to change their mind through motivation can be attributed to levels of acceptance through a variety of levels of motivation. A good example would be if a parent informs their child to do well in school and if levels of success are achieved, then rewards will follow. This is an example of self-persuasion; the child is utilizing self-persuasion to achieve the goal of pleasing the mom and dad as well as receiving a reward. The child is convinced to improve their grades while being motivated by money. Think of it like this: when a child goes to the dentist, it is usually persuaded by a parent that the dentist is not bad and if they do well while at the dentist, they will receive a reward. This is self-persuasion brought on by rewards. When we want to change our behavior, say, to healthier eating, we might try to convince ourselves we don't like the forbidden foods as much as we do, knowing that forbidden food attracts weight gain and health issues, therefore self-persuasion decreases the need for the forbidden food.

== Role-playing ==
The experiment below discusses the effects that role-playing can have on self-persuasion.

Subjects first expressed their positions on whether college education should be general (liberal arts) or specialized (career preparatory), then were led to accept that they would write essays supporting one or the other of these positions. Next, they judged the validity of a standard set of statements representing both views and again expressed their opinions on the same issue. Validity judgments indicated that subjects tended strongly to accept arguments supporting their positions and reject opposing ones when expecting to defend their positions, but accepted nearly equal numbers of arguments on both sides when expecting to advocate the opposing position. Final opinion judgments were influenced by the assigned position's direction even though the role-playing task was not performed. It was concluded that the effectiveness of role-playing in inducing opinion change may be due in large to its success in getting subjects to evaluate.

As time moves forward, role-playing and self-persuasion have amassed. It has become established as a very effective tool for education, management, and forecasting choices in conflicts and negotiations. The understanding of role-playing also allows us opportunities to understand situations that we may not have seen before involving several things from social economics, environmental situations, and political viewpoints. Role-playing is also a way for people to develop certain skills such as listening, conflict resolution, and management effectiveness.

Recent studies involving role-playing and the ability role-playing has to change a person's mind are producing information that indicates passive effects role-playing once had are less now and communication through role-playing is more accepted. The basis for the effectiveness of role-playing procedures in persuasion is poorly understood, although several hypotheses have been advanced. The five hypotheses below, although not directly tested in the present research, must be regarded as promising.

• Selective learning: Playing the role of an advocate of a given position may facilitate opinion change by prompting selective attention to or retention of arguments supporting that position.
• Biased scanning: When the role-playing assignment is accepted, the subject may become temporally motivated to seek arguments that support his assigned position.
• Self as source: Arguments perceived as self-originated may be more readily accepted than ones perceived as externally originated.
• Hand tailoring: An individual may be able to construct a communication that is uniquely effective for his belief structure.
• Dissonance: Acceptance of the role-played position may be in the service of reducing dissonance aroused by counter-attitudinal performance.

== Issue importance ==
Issue importance, within self-persuasion, is to be treated in terms of the priority of self-interest that is at stake for individuals as members of a significant group. Individuals who become emotionally involved with an issue will be most influenced. Thus, issues of high importance would produce a higher need for opinion change, which would then cause a maximal attitude change. Low issue importance would therefore create a minimal attitude change.

== Attitude change ==
Role-playing and issue importance can cause attitude change. The degree of involvement is based on the extent to which an attitudinal position is derived from and upheld by the individual and on the importance of the attitude to the individual's self. “Counterattitudinal role-playing has generally come to be accepted as a more efficacious technique of attitude change; while issue importance has generally pertained to the social significance and personal value of an attitudinal object.”(p. 191). For example, if you wish to play the role of a person who has a lot of courage and this particular issue is of high importance to you, you may through self-persuasion change your attitude to portray that attitude to others.

Theorists have identified ways in which people might be able to change their attitudes simply by thinking differently about an attitude object. These cognitive strategies used in self-persuasion are known as Epistemic and Teleologic. “Epistemic strategies involve re-conceptualizing the attitude objects known shortcomings in a more positive light. Teleologic strategies involve altering the accessibility of thoughts about those shortcomings” (p. 615). These strategies for deliberate self-persuasion presumably take some cognitive effort; that is why individuals high in need for cognition, who find effortful reasoning and problem-solving less stressful than individuals low in need for cognition, would be more inclined to use these two types of self-persuasion.

As seen in persuasion, an attitude may be adopted simply because it is associated with a highly credible, likable, or powerful communicator; but this form of attitude change will only persist as long as the cues that elicited it remain of high importance to the individual. However, individuals who utilize self-persuasion before a speech or a social gathering, can alter their attitudes before they receive a message. This way allows the individual to persuade themselves of its merits and avoid appearing gullible or easily influenced(p. 530). Therefore, the self-persuasion processes could become an important mediator of anticipatory attitude change. Anticipatory shifts occur when individuals merely expecting to hear a counterattitudinal communication, will then change their attitudes in the direction of the anticipated message.

=== Directional Changes in Attitudes (pro and counter) ===
Pro and Counter Attitude: the majority of people are aware that pro-anything means you are for the issue. On the other hand, the majority of people are also aware that the term counter is against. For the most part, people also tend to agree with the idea that people with high self-esteem, seem to demonstrate their ability in a more than proper way when dealing with topics. Attitude affects nearly everything a person does, from success to defeat. A pro attitude in a person can be a confidence booster as well as a mechanism to allow persuasion into a discussion with the attempts to persuade change within the discussion. Attitude persuasion can affect the result of a debate as related to powerful self-esteem. Distractions can weigh heavily on the ability of a person involved in persuasion change about counterattitude.

As in many types of communication efforts, there have been a multitude of theories. During the 1950s and 1960 theories were raised to focus on the motives and functions of individuals and their attitudes. Based on theory, the research identified that attitudes served a multitude of purposes and needs involving the importance of psychological function. During the research, different function labels were used within each theory. The grouping of the functions provided information that attitudes serve a knowledge function assisting to organize a person's environment and this will provide consistency in a person's ability to shift attitude for pro or counter needs.

All attitudes likely serve this basic function to some extent. In addition, attitudes likely serve any of several other motives. Many attitudes serve a utilitarian function, helping to maximize the rewards and minimize the punishments obtained from objects in the environment. Such utilitarian attitudes serve to summarize the outcomes intrinsically associated with objects and to guide behavioral responses that maximize one's interests. For example, one's attitude toward ice cream may serve a utilitarian function because it is likely to be based on rewards, such as a craving, and punishments such as the idea that ice cream will increase the chances of weight gain associated with ice cream. In the pro and counter approach, self-persuasion relates directly to the ice cream and whether or not to take part in it.

This type of attitude change would blossom into a counter-attitude involving self-persuasion. In theory, when trying to self-persuade, the counter-attitude effects one's mind can have on self-persuasion could be related to the counter-effects within the body.

== Four theories that utilize self-persuasion ==
=== Social Judgement Theory ===
Social judgment theory (SJT) is a persuasion theory proposed by Carolyn Sherif, Muzafer Sherif, and Carl Hovland in 1961, and was defined by Sherif and Sherif as the perception and evaluation of an idea by comparing it with current attitudes.

The social judgment theory aims to explain how audiences process messages. The receiver of a message processes the information as a comparison to existing ideas or beliefs on the issue, a sort of lens used to accept or reject the message.

A fundamental of the social judgment theory surrounds two internal elements present with every individual, the first being the anchor point more commonly referred to as attitudes. This lens is always present and is a major component in decision-making. Some of the important characteristics of individual attitudes are: • Stronger attitudes have more influence on any decision to accept or not accept a message. • Not all attitudes or opinions carry equal weight, and attitudes can be negative or positive. • Attitudes are extremely hard to predict since they are unique to any individual. • Behavior does not always indicate a person's attitude. The second element in the social judgment theory is ego involvement. Someone expressing high ego involvement in a topic usually has personal involvement in that topic. This level of ego involvement will help shape an individual's stand on a particular issue. If a message does not conform to the ego involvement of the receiver, that message will likely not be received well, if at all. Falling in this category are politics religion, or any other controversial topics. For this reason, like-minded individuals tend to associate with each other and accept the same ideas.

The combination of beliefs and attitudes regarding any topic comes to be known as individual latitudes. Latitudes are generally grouped into three different categories, either the latitude of acceptance, the latitude of rejection, or the latitude of non-commitment. In the latitude of the acceptance category, messages and ideas get stored if the listener agrees with the message. Likewise, unacceptable messages get stored in the latitude of the rejection category. Messages with no agreement or disagreement, so school he followed the latitude of non-commitment category. Many times, messages cross these categories, especially when judging one's self or judging others. For example, a political stance one finds unacceptable may be acceptable to a friend. While that position is unacceptable to an individual, they do not necessarily find the other person unacceptable.

Social judgment aims to explain how likely a person might be to change their opinion, the likely direction the change of opinion will head, the ability to tolerate the opinions of other people, and the extent to which a person is committed to the position.

=== Elaboration Likelihood Model ===
The Elaboration Likelihood Model (ELM), developed in 1986 by Richard E. Petty and John Cacioppo, is based on the idea that any one variable can influence attitudes in several different ways and can serve to either increase or decrease persuasion through several different mechanisms (Petty et al., 2002).

ELM assumes that there are two routes of persuasive influence: central and peripheral. The key factor in selecting the routes in ELM is involvement; how much a person thinks and invests in a subject to form an opinion. When a person is actively thinking and internally processing the content of a subject, elaboration is high and will most likely follow the central persuasive route. However, when a person is not interested in a subject elaboration is low, which will result in information processed through the peripheral route.

This model proposes that when people are motivated to process information and are cognitively able to engage in the subject, they make decisions through the central route. This type of decision-making results in a permanent attitude shift and the person will begin to elaborate on the arguments presented, further strengthening the argument. When the person is not actively processing the information, the person is subject to making decisions based on periphery issues—like or dislike of speaker, or music in commercials. Petty et al. note that a person's motivation to engage in a subject is not static. For example, a person who suffers from lung cancer may be more motivated to consume information on smoking cessation programs actively. The same person may not be as interested in consuming information about gardening and will therefore process the information on a peripheral level.

ELM also assumes that two variables affect how people think: situational and personality. Other factors that influence how a person chooses to process information received include intelligence, time available, how much the person already knows about the topic, communication distractions, and how often the message is repeated (Rucker & Petty, 2006; Wagner & Petty, 2011).

=== Cognitive Dissonance ===
Cognitive Dissonance expresses an individual's desire for consistency between what they expect and the reality of any situation; however with the lack of this agreement, comes cognitive dissonance, according to many theorists, the first of which being Leon Festinger. When developing his Cognitive Dissonance Theory, Festinger concluded: “There are two major sources of cognition, namely, own experience and communication from others.” (p. 382).

Festinger asserted that individuals understand that different inputs are not necessarily psychologically consistent with one another. When given the option between inconsistent inputs, the person suffering the dissonance will, in one way or another, try to make the option more consistent; or, in other words, strive for internal consistency(p. 93).

Whenever presented with two bits of information that do not seem to fit together psychologically, the result is a dissonant relationship between the two. Understanding that cognitive dissonance works as a motivator towards states of affairs, the individual suffering the dissonance can often change their attitude, thus making the two competing ideas least dissonant. Festinger theorized the key to relationships between various cognitions fall into one of three categories:

Consonant relationship – Cognitions or actions consistent with one another
Irrelevant relationship – Cognitions or actions unrelated to one another
Dissonant relationship – Cognitions or actions that are inconsistent with one another

The amount of dissonance, and the corresponding mental distress relies on two basic factors: 1) the importance of the cognitions, where the greater the personal value of the elements is, the greater the resulting level of dissonance. For example, a matter involving cutting funding for schools to cut taxes will have wide-ranging amounts of dissonance between a parent and a nonparent.; 2) the ratio of the cognitions, where the relationship between dissonant and consonant elements vary in proportion. In the school example, a parent, a potential parent, and a person who has decided to never have children will view the scenario differently, since the weight of what is desirable (consonant) and what is undesirable (dissonant) differs between those affected by the decision.

==== Other Work on the Theory ====
While Festinger first conceptualized the theory, there have been others with different, or will you like it to the nicer encourage slightly different views regarding what causes dissonance. In one interpretation, drive is a key factor, “Dissonance theory, in general, concerns the relationship between various cognitions. The theory posits the existence of a drive-like motivation to maintain consistency among relevant cognitions”(p. 465).

One of Festinger's rivals, as referred by many - Daryl J. Bem offers his alternative to the theory and calls it self-perception. Bem emphasizes the following ideas of social input and socialization. “Self-awareness, one's ability to respond differently to his behavior and its controlling variables, is a product of social interaction”(p. 199). And, “again, it is evident that self-awareness is a set of behaviors which must be learned from a socializing community that sets up the necessary contingencies of reinforcement for establishing the discriminations”(p. 217).

Arguably, when examining Festinger's and Bem's theories, Miller (1995) addresses a few curious questions: “How closely and accurately do people examine their behaviors? Are both theories comparable in the degree, accuracy, or level of self-awareness they require? How necessary is self-evaluation on a conscious level for either or both theories?”(p. 8).

=== The Narrative Paradigm ===
Walter Fisher's Narrative Paradigm Theory posits that all meaningful communication is a form of storytelling or giving a report of events and that human beings experience and comprehend life as a series of ongoing narratives, each with its conflicts, characters, beginning, middle, and end. Fisher believes that all forms of communication that appeal to our reason are best viewed as stories shaped by history, culture, and character, and all forms of human communication are to be seen fundamentally as stories

The main points of the Narrative Paradigm are:

1. People are essentially storytellers.

2. People make decisions because they feel they have a good reason to do so rather than because of evidence.

3. What people do and how people think is swayed by history, biography, culture, and character.

4. People are continually choosing personal stories and these stories are constantly changing.

5. Narrative rationality is determined by the coherence and fidelity of the story, which measure a story's truthfulness and humanity.

This paradigm suggests that people choose what they want to believe and that their beliefs are influenced by external factors. Communicating in the narrative enables people to share their understandings of how the world works and allows them to identify with one another, particularly if people share similar beliefs.

Fisher's original theory was published in 1984 under The Narrative Paradigm: In the Beginning, however, he clarified his position in 1985 in The Narrative Paradigm: The Elaboration. Fisher writes that the narrative paradigm is a paradigm in the sense of a philosophical view of human communication; it is not a model of discourse as such. The primary function of the paradigm is to offer a way of interpreting and assessing human communication that leads to critique, a determination of whether or not a given instance of discourse provides a reliable, trustworthy, and desirable guide to thought and action in the world. It predicts that all normal human discourse is meaningful and is subject to the tests of narrative rationality (p 351.

== See also ==
- Social Influence
- Social Psychology
- Carl Hovland
