= Russell Hurlburt =

American Psychologist

Russell T. Hurlburt (born 1945) is a professor of psychology at the University of Nevada, Las Vegas. He is the founder of the Descriptive Experience Sampling method, which aims to reveal the contents of consciousness over short spans of time.

== Early life and education ==
Russell T. Hurlburt, the son of Richard G. Hurlburt and Ruth (née Sherrard) Hurlburt, married Roberta Rochkar in 1967. He earned his Bachelors of Science in engineering in aeronautical engineering from Princeton University. He received a M.S. in mechanical engineering in 1967 from the University of New Mexico.

Hurlburt took up the study of psychology while playing trumpet at military funerals during the Vietnam War. He was frustrated by the lack of attention psychology gave to everyday experiences and decided to pursue this. He earned a Ph.D. in clinical psychology, with an unpublished dissertation titled Self-observation and self-control, at the University of South Dakota.

== Career ==
Hurlburt started developing Descriptive Experience Sampling (DES) in the 1970s. In 1973 he invented a beeper capable of delivering random beeps and patented it. Hurlburt's research started with the use of the beeper device in naturalistic settings. Originally he gave participants a questionnaire with a limited range of options. This facilitated quantitative comparison. Hurlburt reportedly grew frustrated at the limitations this placed on unveiling experience. He moved towards more in-depth qualitative interviewing.

DES recommendations for how first-person reports could be more accurately obtained include 1) interrupting a process at the moment it is occurring, 2) alerting subjects to pay careful attention to their cognitive process, and 3) coaching them in introspective procedures.

When refining the method, Hurlburt at first sampled himself extensively for around a year. He then concluded that it would be better not to use himself as a subject. Phenomena that he observed in himself he might more easily attribute to others. For approximately the next 25 years, he declined to participate in DES as a subject until the urgings of his students convinced him to try.

Hurlburt is a professor of psychology at the University of Nevada, Las Vegas.

== Selected publications ==
=== Books ===
- Hurlburt, Russell T. (2012-12-06). Sampling Normal and Schizophrenic Inner Experience. Springer Science & Business Media. ISBN 978-1-4757-0289-7.
- Hurlburt, Russell T. (1993-06-30). Sampling Inner Experience in Disturbed Affect. Springer Science & Business Media. ISBN 978-0-306-44377-0.
- Hurlburt, Russell T. (1994). Comprehending behavioral statistics. Thomson Brooks/Cole Publishing Co. ISBN 978-1-4652-0178-2.
- Hurlburt, Russell T.; Heavey, Christopher L. (2006-03-15). Exploring Inner Experience: The descriptive experience sampling method. John Benjamins Publishing. ISBN 978-90-272-9387-9.
- Hurlburt, Russell T. (2011-06-27). Investigating Pristine Inner Experience: Moments of Truth. Cambridge University Press. ISBN 978-1-139-49960-6.
- Caracciolo, Marco; Hurlburt, Russell T. (2016). A Passion for Specificity: Confronting Inner Experience in Literature and Science. Ohio State University Press. ISBN 978-0-8142-1320-9.
- Hurlburt, Russell; Schwitzgebel, Eric (August 9, 2011). Describing Inner Experience? Proponent Meets Skeptic. MIT Press (published August 19, 2011). ISBN 978-0-262-51649-5.

=== Articles ===
- Hurlburt, Russell T.; Alderson-Day, Ben; Kühn, Simone; Fernyhough, Charles (2016-02-04). "Exploring the Ecological Validity of Thinking on Demand: Neural Correlates of Elicited vs. Spontaneously Occurring Inner Speech". PLOS ONE. 11 (2) e0147932. Bibcode:2016PLoSO..1147932H. doi:10.1371/journal.pone.0147932. ISSN 1932-6203. PMC 4741522. PMID 26845028.
- Hurlburt, R. T.; Happé, F.; Frith, U. (May 1994). "Sampling the form of inner experience in three adults with Asperger syndrome". Psychological Medicine. 24 (2): 385–395. doi:10.1017/S0033291700027367. ISSN 1469-8978. PMID 8084934.
- Hurlburt, Russell T.; Heavey, Christopher L.; Kelsey, Jason M. (2013-12-01). "Toward a phenomenology of inner speaking". Consciousness and Cognition. 22 (4): 1477–1494. doi:10.1016/j.concog.2013.10.003. ISSN 1053-8100. PMID 24184987.
- Heavey, Christopher L.; Hurlburt, Russell T. (2008-09-01). "The phenomena of inner experience". Consciousness and Cognition. 17 (3): 798–810. doi:10.1016/j.concog.2007.12.006. ISSN 1053-8100. PMID 18258456.
- Hurlburt, Russell T.; Heavey, Christopher L. (September 1, 2001). "Telling what we know: describing inner experience". Trends in Cognitive Sciences. 5 (9): 400–403. doi:10.1016/S1364-6613(00)01724-1. PMID 11520705.
- Hurlburt, Russell T.; Akhter, Sarah A. (2006-12-01). "The Descriptive Experience Sampling method". Phenomenology and the Cognitive Sciences. 5 (3): 271–301. doi:10.1007/s11097-006-9024-0. ISSN 1572-8676.
- Hurlburt, Russell T.; Akhter, Sarah A. (2008-12-01). "Unsymbolized thinking". Consciousness and Cognition. 17 (4): 1364–1374. doi:10.1016/j.concog.2008.03.021. ISSN 1053-8100. PMID 18456514.

=== Patent ===
- 3986136, Hurlburt, Russell T., "Random interval generators and method of behavior modification using same", issued 1976-10-12

== Additional sources ==
- Douglas, Kate. (2023). How are you thinking. New Scientist.
- Oakes, Kelly. (2019). What the voice inside your head says about you. BBC Future.
