= Journal of Intercultural Communication Research =

- Discipline: Communication studies
- Language: English
- Edited by: Diyako Rahmani

Publication details
- History: 1972-present
- Publisher: Routledge
- Frequency: Triannual

Standard abbreviations
- ISO 4: J. Intercult. Commun. Res.

Indexing
- ISSN: 1747-5759 (print); 1747-5767 (web)
- OCLC no.: 265890140

Links
- Journal homepage; Online access; Online archive

Journal of Intercultural Communication Research is a peer-reviewed academic journal covering qualitative and quantitative research that focuses on interrelationships between culture and communication. The journal is published by Routledge on behalf of the World Communication Association and the editor-in-chief is Diyako Rahmani.

== Abstracting and indexing ==
The journal is abstracted and indexed in Communication and Mass Media Complete.
