= Behavior change =

Behavior change can refer to any transformation or modification of human behavior.

It may also refer to:

- Behavior change (public health), a broad range of activities and approaches which focus on the individual, community, and environmental influences on behavior
- Behavior change (individual), a rapid and involuntary change of behavior sometimes associated with a mental disorder or a side effect of medication
- Behavioral change theories
- Behavior change communication
- Behavior change methods
- Behavioral Change Stairway Model, a law enforcement technique in crisis negotiation

== See also ==
- Behavior modification
- Behavior management
- Behavioral cusp
- Persuasive technology
- Health coaching
- Health action process approach
- Barrier analysis
