= Behavior change method =

Behavior change methods, or behavior change techniques, are theory-based methods for changing one or several determinants of behavior such as a person's attitude or self-efficacy. Such behavior change methods are used in behavior change interventions. Although of course attempts to influence people's attitude and other psychological determinants were much older, especially the definition developed in the late nineties yielded useful insights, in particular four important benefits:

1. It developed a generic, abstract vocabulary that facilitated discussion of the active ingredients of an intervention
2. It emphasized the distinction between behavior change methods and practical applications of these methods
3. It included the concept of 'parameters for effectiveness', important conditions for effectiveness often neglected
4. It drew attention to the fact that behavior change methods influence specific determinants (when developing an intervention, one first has to identify the relevant determinant, and then, identify matching behavior change methods, see also the steps in intervention mapping).

Traditionally, reports of evaluations of behavior change interventions barely described the actual intervention, making it very difficult to identify the most effective methods. This was increasingly recognized in the late nineties and early twenty-first century, where behavior change methods gained increasing popularity, and another taxonomy was developed and subsequently gained popularity that enabled the coding of previously published interventions.

== Basic definition ==
A behavior change method is any process that has the potential to influence psychological determinants. Psychological determinants are theoretical variables in people's heads, comparable to risk factors in epidemiology, but only including psychological variables. Examples of such determinants are attitude, risk perception (which is in fact an element of the attitude determinant according to the reasoned action approach), self-efficacy, and habit. These determinants are included in theories of behavior explanation such as the reasoned action approach and health belief model. Other theories explain how such determinants may be changed, such as the social cognitive theory (which is in fact also a theory to explain behavior), the elaboration likelihood model, and the extended parallel process model. Examples of well-known, and frequently applied, behavior change methods are fear appeals, persuasive communication, and modeling.

The concept of a behavior change method can be illustrated, for example, using the metaphor of physical exercise. When a person wants to get larger biceps, the person can use a dumbbell and perform exercises. These exercises cause changes in the biceps that cause it to grow. The underlying principle that exercising a muscle causes it to grow (in a nutshell) is called the change method. Of course, this method can have a variety of different applications depending on which muscle the person wants to train. In addition, there are certain parameters that must be satisfied for the exercises to be effective.

There is no 'golden behavior change method'. Although some behavior change methods, such as modeling, can be used to target several determinants, there exists no method capable of influencing all determinants. In addition, depending on the context and target population of an intervention, and the practical applications that can be used, some methods may be more appropriate choices for influencing a determinant than others. However, it can be said that in general, including more behavior change methods does increase the effectiveness of an intervention.

== As a vocabulary ==
Progress in behavior change science is realized through the accumulation of findings from many intervention evaluations. These outcomes can be integrated in a meta-analysis, allowing the most effective methods to emerge. Of course, this requires psychologists to use a more-or-less standardized vocabulary. Descriptions of behavior change methods and their definitions provide such a vocabulary, thereby enhancing the accuracy of meta-analyses. Well-known vocabularies are provided by the taxonomy of Abraham and Michie and intervention mapping. Note however, that not all taxonomies contain all relevant aspects of behavior change methods. For example, the Abraham and Michie taxonomy does not (yet) include parameters for effectiveness.

== Theoretical versus practical applications ==
The intervention mapping formulation of behavior change methods links a description of behavior change methods to the distinction from applications. An application is the practical incarnation of the method in a particular intervention. For example, one intervention can use modeling by using a vignette, whereas another intervention can use exactly the same theoretical method (i.e. modeling), but in a completely different incarnation, for example by organizing peer education. An application, therefore, is the translation of a theoretical method to a specific context, population, culture, and often to a specific medium.

This distinction between theoretical methods and practical applications is crucial because of two reasons. First, evidence as to the effectiveness of behavior change methods is generally only available for generic behavioral methods. Second, because behavior change methods are only effective if the parameters for effectiveness are met, intervention descriptions are incomplete when they do not describe both which theoretical methods they use and to which practical applications these were translated.

== Parameters for effectiveness ==
Each behavior change method has a set of parameters for effectiveness. For example, the popular method of fear appeals, that aims to appeal to a person's fear as a drive for behavior change, will not work when it does not manage to induce, in the targeted individuals:

1. High perceived severity of the threat at hand;
2. High perceived susceptibility to the threat;
3. High perceived self-efficacy, that is, one's ability to perform a behavior to negate the threat; and
4. High perceived response efficacy, the effectiveness of the behavior in negating the threat

The relevant theory of change, the extended parallel process model, explains that when one of these four variables is low, no behavior change will occur, and in fact, it is even possible that a person will engage in health-defeating behavior.

Thus, when a program planner that wants to develop an intervention, and that planner established that risk perception is indeed an important determinant (which is in fact rarely the case), that planner could use an appropriate method to target that determinant (fear appeals), but when this method's parameters for effectiveness are not respected, the intervention will still be ineffective (e.g. when the intervention does not manage to successfully enhance self-efficacy). While such an intervention could potentially cause desirable behavior change in individuals that were already high in self-efficacy, the same intervention could backfire (i.e. cause undesirable behavior change) in individuals with low self-efficacy.

Similarly, when a program planner identifies self-efficacy as an important determinant, and that planner uses an appropriate method (modeling), respecting the parameters for effectiveness of modeling (target group individuals must be able to identify with the model; the model should be a 'coping model', struggling with the relevant behavior but eventually managing, and not a 'mastery model' who effortlessly accomplishes the desired behavior; the model should be reinforced for the behavior; and the target group member has to possess the relevant skills), the intervention has a high probability for success.

== More holistic approaches ==
Increasingly applied researchers looking to increase the effectiveness of behaviour change interventions have embraced a more holistic view than relying on purely psychological forces internal to the person or group being targeted for change. The Behaviour Change Wheel (BCW), for instance, is a framework for the systematic design and development of behaviour change interventions, which, while psychologically-rooted, also incorporates factors such as the capability of a person to change, or whether they realistically have the opportunity to change. In this way it responds to criticism of behaviour change methods as being too focussed on deficits within individuals and less focussed on the real world contexts in which people live.

While heavily developed in health behaviour, building behaviour change methods based on the Behaviour Change Wheel is now expanding into energy behaviour, conservation policy, and even into student engagement behaviour. In this way, behaviour change methods begin to overlap with ideas from behavioural economists who rely on subtle changes to the environment to ‘nudge’ individuals towards the optimum socially positive choice. (see also Nudge Theory)

== See also ==
- Behavior change (public health)
- Behavioural change theories
- Lifestyle medicine
- Social and behavior change communication
