= Care Group approach =

The Care Group Approach is a community-based behavior change strategy that engages and leverages paid community health workers and volunteers to lower deaths and malnutrition in preschool children (<5 years) by promoting key behaviors for maternal, newborn, and child health. Care Groups create a multiplying effect, reaching all households with caregivers in a community at low cost, improving behavior change through peer support, and through creation of new social norms. Research has identified key elements that underlie the approach's success, and the approach has been continuously modified to reach new target cohorts (e.g., fathers) and to promote behaviors in many technical areas including health, nutrition, water, sanitation and hygiene, food insecurity, gender norms, child protection, positive parenting, and maternal mental health. Several studies have shown results to be sustainable and to help build community resilience to shocks. This approach is associated with documented decreases in under-five mortality and malnutrition.

== Background ==
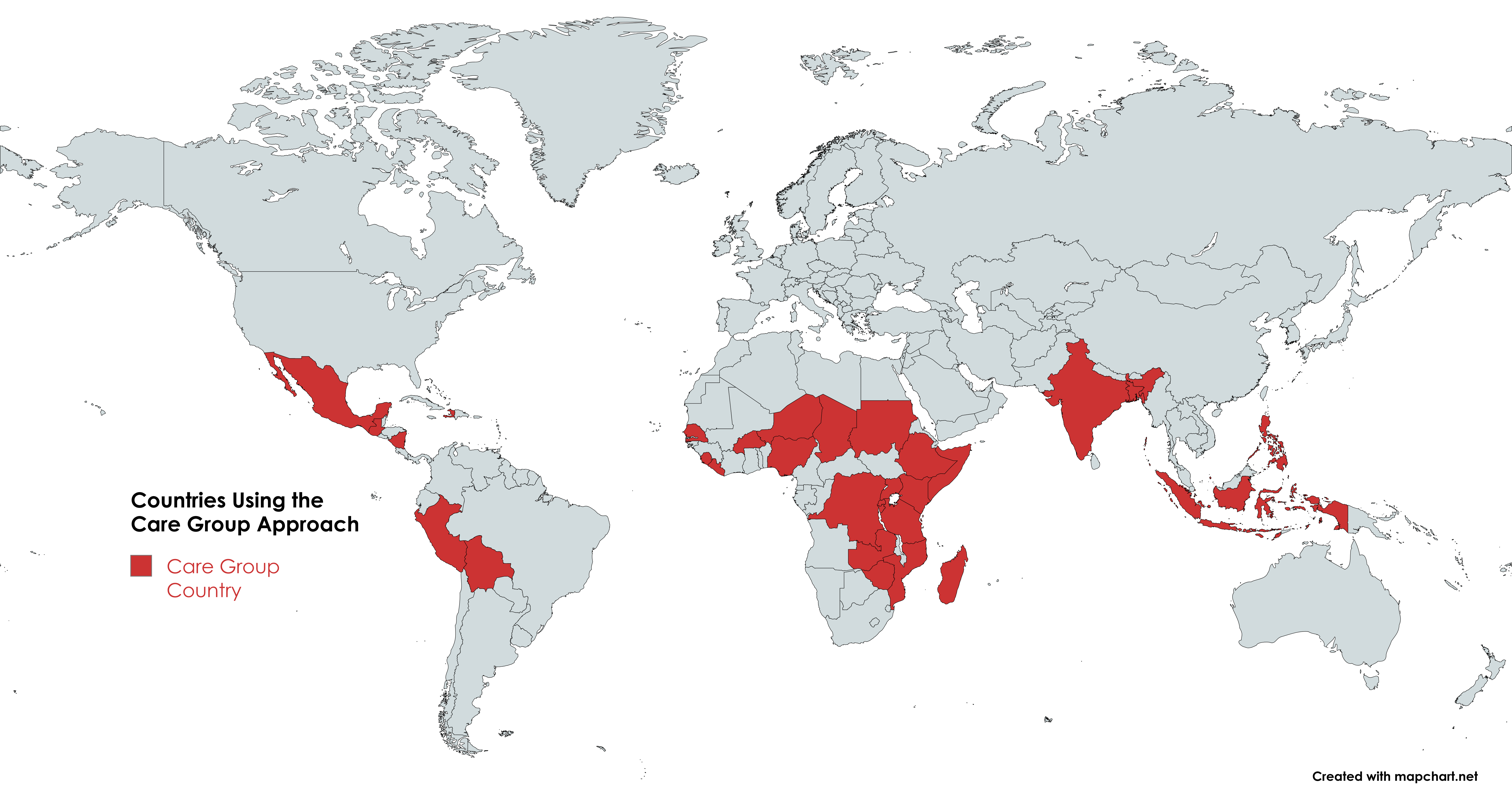
Countries where the Care Group Approach has been used (April 2025)

The Care Group approach was pioneered in 1995 by World Relief in Mozambique under the leadership of Drs. Pieter Ernst and Muriel Elmer. The approach expanded in 1997 when Food for the Hungry implemented a project in Mozambique's Sofala Province, under the leadership of Tom Davis and Adugna Kebede, with USAID Title II Food for Peace funding, after receiving training from World Relief. Shortly afterwards, World Relief further expanded use of the model through additional funding from the US Child Survival and Health Grants Program for projects in Gaza Province, Mozambique (1999–2003), as well as in Cambodia (1998), Malawi (2000), and Rwanda (2001). World Relief and Food for the Hungry played central roles in refining and spreading the methodology, which was subsequently adopted by at least nine other organizations for CSHGP-funded initiatives. Early Care Group projects were launched in Mozambique, Cambodia, Malawi, and Rwanda, focusing on promoting critical MNCH behaviors at the community level. In addition to those mentioned above, many public health experts were heavily involved in co-pioneering, scaling and disseminating the approach including Melanie Morrow, Sarah Borger, Olga Wollinka, Debbie Dortzbach, Bonnie Kittle, Henry Perry, Mary DeCoster, Karen Neiswender, Jenn Weiss, Mitzi Hanold, Carolyn Wetzel, and others.

== Structure and function ==
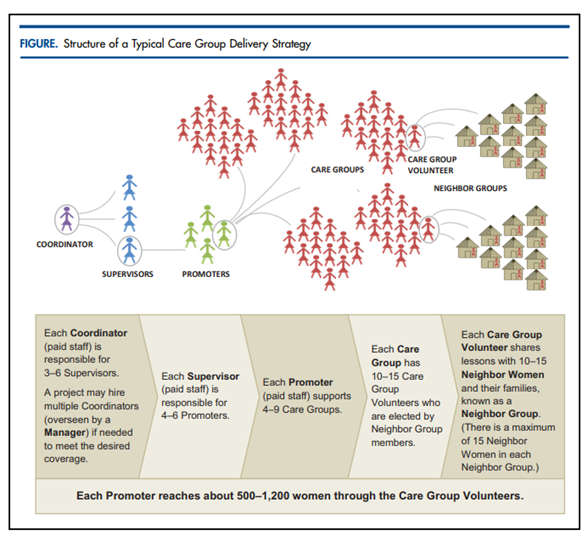

Care Groups are composed of approximately 10-15 volunteer health educators who meet biweekly with a Community Health Worker or a promoter for training and supervision. Each volunteer is responsible for cascading down what they learn and promoting health, nutrition and other behaviors among a cohort of 10-15 households, using peer-to-peer communication and visual aids. Essential criteria for Care Groups include manageable workloads, consistent household contact (at least monthly, but often biweekly), and regular supervision to ensure quality and sustainability. Care Group Volunteers typically work about 5–10 hours a week, below the threshold of "excessive work hours for volunteers" of 10 hours per week of unsalaried work. The Care Group approach often is used with several tools (many of which are mentioned in the training manual) such as Quality Improvement and Verification Checklists, Barrier Analysis, Positive Deviance Inquiries, and Lot Quality Assurance Sampling.

== Evidence of effectiveness ==
Numerous studies have documented the effectiveness of the Care Group Approach. Projects using this approach have reported an average 32% reduction in under-five mortality, malnutrition (underweight, wasting, and stunting) especially when combined with food supplements, significant decreases in diarrheal disease prevalence, and high coverage of practices like oral rehydration therapy, immunization and the use of insecticide-treated bed nets. An analysis of 13 Care Group projects and 50 projects using other approaches to behavior change using USG funding found that vaccination, nutrition and other indicators were higher in the Care Group projects. Specifically, projects using Care Groups had better performance with 20-32 percentage points greater than non-CG projects for Vitamin A supplementation, exclusive breastfeeding, complementary feeding, tetanus toxoid vaccination, and infant and young child feeding practices. Coverage for DPT1 (a marker for "zero dose children") and measles vaccination were 12.5 and 9.2 percentage points higher in Care Group projects. A similar published study by George et al. compared the effectiveness of ten Care Group projects to nine non-Care Group projects (in the same five African and Asian countries, during the same time period, and using the same funding source) and found that projects using the Care Group approach had more than double the coverage increases for all 15 key child survival interventions assessed, and 53% better estimated reduction in under-five child deaths. The cost-effectiveness of Care Group projects is notable, with average costs of $3–8 per beneficiary per year and costs per life saved ranging from $441 to $3,773.

== Adaptations and expansions ==
Since its inception, when the Care Group Approach was mainly used to promote health, nutrition and WASH behaviors, it has been adapted to address a broader array of health issues and populations, including food insecurity, child protection, tuberculosis control, gender norms, positive parenting, and maternal mental health. World Vision International's Nurturing Care Groups model (created by Davis in 2022), addresses all five of the components of WHO's Nurturing Care Framework. The "Trios" Care Group model involves significant outreach to both fathers and mothers-in-law, as well as mothers of preschool children. The approach has also been applied successfully in post-emergency and refugee settings, such as in Uganda's refugee camps, and integrated with food security initiatives. As implementation expands beyond its earlier use in USG programs, its caring ethos should be maintained, and effective management will be needed to safeguard Care Group volunteers (CGVs) as well as the salaried CHWs who train and supervise them to avoid overwork, consistent with the approach's guidance.

== Challenges and future directions ==
While the Care Group approach has proven effective in numerous contexts, both challenges and opportunities remain in implementing it within government health systems and securing sustainable financing. Future directions include expanding the approach in high-mortality and fragile and conflict-affected regions and further integrating it into national health systems with support for long-term funding.
