= Pathos =

Greek rhetorical term for appeals to emotion

Pathos (Note: UK: /ˈpeɪθɒs/ PAY-thos, US: /ˈpeɪθoʊs/ PAY-thohs; pl. pathea, pathe or pathoses) (Note: Ancient Greek: πάθος, romanized: páthos, lit. 'suffering or experience') is a Greek term referring to appeal to the emotions and ideals of the audience, eliciting feelings that already reside in them. Pathos is most often used in rhetoric, in which it is considered one of the three modes of persuasion, alongside ethos and logos. It is also used as in literature, film, and other narrative art.

== Methods ==
Emotional appeals can be utilized through metaphors, expressive delivery, and storytelling. These methods can influence audiences into accepting ideas that a story presents.

In communication research, pathos has been studied through appeals to fear, public messaging, politics, and content uploaded to the internet. Researchers are still undecided whether emotional appeals are a valid tool in debates and arguments, or if they are manipulative fallacies.

== Philosophy ==
In Stoicism, pathos refers to "complaints of the soul". Succumbing to pathos is an internal event (i.e., in one's soul) that consists in an erroneous response to impressions external to it. This view of pathos, and the accompanying view that all pathos is to be extirpated (in order to achieve the state of apatheia), are related by Stoics to a specific picture of the nature of the soul, of psychological functioning, and of human action. A key feature of that picture is that succumbing to pathos is an error of reason – an intellectual mistake.

Epicureanism interpreted and placed pathos in much more colloquial means and situations, placing it in pleasure, and studying it in almost every facet in regard to pleasure, analyzing emotional specificity that an individual may feel or may need to undergo to appreciate said pathos.

== Rhetoric ==
=== Aristotle's text on pathos ===
In Rhetoric, Aristotle identifies three artistic modes of persuasion, one of which is "awakening emotion (pathos) in the audience so as to induce them to make the judgment desired." In the first chapter, he includes the way in which "men change their opinion in regard to their judgment. As such, emotions have specific causes and effects" (Book 2.1.2–3). Aristotle identifies pathos as one of the three essential modes of proof by his statement that "to understand the emotions—that is, to name them and describe them, to know their causes and the way in which they are excited (1356a24–1356a25). Aristotle posits that, alongside pathos, the speaker must also deploy good ethos in order to establish credibility (Book 2.1.5–9).

Aristotle details what individual emotions are useful to a speaker (Book 2.2.27). In doing so, Aristotle focused on whom, toward whom, and why, stating that "[i]t is not enough to know one or even two of these points; unless we know all three, we shall be unable to arouse anger in anyone. The same is true of the other emotions." He also arranges the emotions with one another so that they may counteract one another. For example, one would pair sadness with happiness (Book 2.1.9).

With this understanding, Aristotle argues for the rhetor to understand the entire situation of goals and audiences to decide which specific emotion the speaker would exhibit or call upon in order to persuade the audience. Aristotle's theory of pathos has three main foci: the frame of mind the audience is in, the variation of emotion between people, and the influence the rhetor has on the emotions of the audience. Aristotle classifies the third of this trio as the ultimate goal of pathos. Similarly, Aristotle outlines the individual importance of persuasive emotions, as well as the combined effectiveness of these emotions on the audience. Antoine Braet did a re-examination of Aristotle's text and in this he examined the speaker's goal of the effect on the audience. Braet explains there are three perspectives of every emotion that a speaker is trying to arouse from the audience: the audience's condition, who the audience is feeling these emotions for, and the motive. Moreover, Aristotle pointedly discusses pleasure and pain in relation to the reactions these two emotions cause in an audience member. According to Aristotle, emotions vary from person to person. Therefore, he stresses the importance of understanding specific social situations in order to successfully utilize pathos as a mode of persuasion.

Aristotle identifies the introduction and the conclusion as the two most important places for an emotional appeal in any persuasive argument.

In their interpretation of Aristotle's notion of pathos, the Danish rhetoricians Marie Lund and Carsten Madsen have applied the thought of Martin Heidegger on Aristotle's text. The study offers a departure from common notions of pathos, interpreting pathos not so much as an instrumental rhetorical device, but rather as a rhetorical processing of the emotional disposition of the audience towards the matter at hand.

=== Alternative views on pathos ===
Scholars have discussed the different interpretations of Aristotle's views of rhetoric and his philosophy. Some believe that Aristotle may not have even been the inventor of his famous persuasion methods. In the second chapter of Rhetoric, Aristotle's view on pathos changes from the use in discourse to the understanding of emotions and their effects. William Fortenbaugh pointed out that for the Sophist Gorgias, "Being overcome with emotion is analogous to rape." Aristotle opposed this view and created a systematic approach to pathos. Fortenbaugh argues that Aristotle's systematic approach to emotional appeals "depends upon correctly understanding the nature of individual emotions, upon knowing the conditions favorable to, the objects of, and the grounds for individual emotions". Modern philosophers were typically more skeptical of the use of emotions in communication, with political theorists such as John Locke hoping to extract emotion from reasoned communication entirely. George Campbell presents another view unlike the common systematic approach of Aristotle. Campbell explored whether appeals to emotion or passions would be "an unfair method of persuasion," identifying seven circumstances to judge emotions: probability, plausibility, importance, proximity in time, connection of place, relations to the persons concerned, and interest in the consequences.

The 84 BC Rhetorica ad Herennium book of an unknown author theorizes that the conclusion is the most important place in a persuasive argument to consider emotions such as mercy or hatred, depending on the nature of the persuasion. The "appeal to pity", as it is classified in Rhetorica ad Herennium, is a means to conclude by reiterating the major premise of the work and tying while incorporating an emotional sentiment. The author suggests ways in which to appeal to the pity of the audience: "We shall stir pity in our hearers by recalling vicissitudes of future; by comparing the prosperity we once enjoyed with our present adversity; by entreating those whose pity we seek to win, and by submitting ourselves to their mercy." Additionally, the text impresses the importance of invoking kindness, humanity and sympathy upon the hearer. Finally, the author suggests that the appeal to pity be brief for "nothing dries more quickly than a tear."

=== Pathos before Aristotle ===
The concept of emotional appeal existed in rhetoric long before Aristotle's Rhetoric. George A. Kennedy, a well-respected, modern-day scholar, identifies the appeal to emotions in the newly formed democratic court system before 400 BC in his book, The Art of Persuasion in Greece. Gorgias, a Sophist who preceded Aristotle, was interested in the orator's emotional appeal as well. Gorgias believed the orator was able to capture and lead the audience in any direction they pleased through the use of emotional appeal. In the Encomium of Helen, Gorgias states that a soul can feel a particular sentiment on account of words such as sorrow and pity. Certain words act as "bringers-on of pleasure and takers-off of pain. Furthermore, Gorgias equates emotional persuasion to the sensation of being overtaken by a drug: "[f]or just as different drug draw off different humors from the body, and some put an end to disease and other to life, so too of discourses: some give pain, others delight, others terrify, others rouse the hearers to courage, and yet others by a certain vile persuasion drug and trick to soul."

Plato also discussed emotional appeal in rhetoric. Plato preceded Aristotle and therefore laid the groundwork, as did other Sophists, for Aristotle to theorize the concept of pathos. In his dialogue Gorgias, Plato discusses pleasure versus pain in the realm of pathos though in a (probably fictional) conversation between Gorgias and Socrates. The dialogue between several ancient rhetors that Plato created centers around the value of rhetoric, and the men incorporate aspects of pathos in their responses. Gorgias discredits pathos and instead promotes the use of ethos in persuasion. In another of Plato's texts, Phaedrus, his discussion of emotions is more pointed; however, he still does not outline exactly how emotions manipulate an audience. Plato discusses the danger of emotions in oratory. He argues that emotional appeal in rhetoric should be used as the means to an end and not the point of the discussion.

=== Contemporary pathos ===
George Campbell, a contributor to the Scottish Enlightenment, was one of the first rhetoricians to incorporate scientific evidence into his theory of emotional appeal. Campbell relied heavily on a book written by physician David Hartley, entitled Observations on Man. The book synthesized emotions and neurology and introduced the concept that action is a result of impression. Hartley determined that emotions drive people to react to appeals based on circumstance but also passions made up of cognitive impulses. Campbell argues that belief and persuasion depend heavily on the force of an emotional appeal. Furthermore, Campbell introduced the importance of the audience's imagination and will on emotional persuasion that is just as important as basic understanding of an argument. Campbell, by drawing on the theories of rhetoricians before him, drew up a contemporary view of pathos that incorporates the psychological aspect of emotional appeal.

== Pathos in communication research ==
=== Appeals to fear ===
Communication scholars have studied the manner in which pathos is used to influence audiences into attaching and responding to messages. Kim Witte's extended parallel process model found that appealing to fear is an effective method when audiences consider a threat to be legitimate and think they are able to take measures to affect said threat. If audiences believe the threat is beyond their control, they are less likely to respond to the message and more likely to deny or avoid it.

=== Public messaging ===
James Price Dillard and Robin Nabi argued that appeals to specific emotions like fear, guilt, and hope affect audiences in different manners during their studies on cancer prevention messaging. They concluded that messengers that rely on persuading their audiences should consider specific emotions to appeal to, rather than if their message makes an audience simply feel good or bad.

=== Storytelling ===
Emotional appeals are also effective through storytelling. Melanie C. Green and Timothy C. Brock found that audiences that become immersed, or "transported", in a story are more likely to buy into the messages of said story and less likely to challenge them.

== Pathos in politics ==
Pathos has its hand in politics as well, primarily in speech and how to persuade the audience. Mshvenieradze states that "Pathos is directly linked with an audience. Audience is a collective subject of speakers on which an orator tries to impact by own argumentation." Politicians use Pathos to appeal to voters' emotions in a similar way to how Aristotle details its use in rhetoric. In the case of politics and politicians, it is primarily more argumentative writing and speaking. In Book II of Aristotle's writings in Rhetoric, in essence knowing people's emotions helps to enable one to act with words versus writing alone, to earn another's credibility and faith.

As Aristotle's teachings expanded, many other groups of thinkers would go on to adopt different variations of political usage with the elements of pathos involved, which includes groups such as the Epicureans and Stoics.

Emotional appeals also affect how far political messages spread across the internet and social media. William J. Brady and colleagues studied over 500,000 tweets about subjects like gun control, same-sex marriage, and climate change, finding that usage of moral-emotional words increased the sharing of a tweet by around 20%. Their research also found that most of the spreading of these tweets occurred from users who already shared the same views as the author.

== Pathos in advertising ==
The contemporary landscape for advertising is highly competitive due to the sheer amount of marketing done by companies. Pathos has become a popular tool to draw consumers in as it targets their emotional side. Studies show that emotion influences people's information processing and decision-making, making pathos a tool for persuading consumers to buy goods and services. In this digital age, "designers must go beyond aesthetics and industrial feasibility to integrate the aspect of 'emotional awareness'". Companies today contain current culture references in their advertisement and oftentimes strive to make the audience feel involved.

== Pathos in digital media ==
Pathos is also used to create viral media online that spread far throughout the internet. Through a study of over 7,000 New York Times articles, marketing researches Jonah Berger and Katherine L. Milkman concluded that articles that sparked high-arousal emotions such as anger, anxiety, and/or amazement increased the likelihood of an article to be shared by a reader. Articles that sparked low-arousal emotions, such as sadness, saw the adverse effect. They also noticed that articles that focused on positive content were more likely to be shared. These findings suggest that emotional appeals affect both the likelihood that a message resonating with its audience, as well as the vitality and sharing of a message.

== Pathos and fallacy ==
By some, appeals to emotion are seen as a weakness in arguments. Some appeals, such as appealing to pity or fear, are categorized as logical fallacies. Craig Waddell, a communication scholar, argued against this view in a public hearings study held by the Cambridge Experimentation Review Board in the 1970s. Waddle said that despite the cultural bias against emotional appeals, the board often used pathos to help make decisions on their policies.

== Pathos in research ==
Pathos can also be also used in credited medical journals, research and other academic pieces of writing. The goal is to appeal to the readers' emotion while maintaining the necessary requirements of the medical discourse community. Authors may do so, by using certain vocabulary to elicit an emotional response from the audience. “God-terms” are often used as a rhetorical technique. It is imperative that authors still preserve the standard of writing within the medical community by focusing on factual and scientific information without use of personal opinion.

== Pathos in art ==
It can be argued that most artwork falls under the realm of pathos. Throughout history artists have used pathos within their work by utilizing colors, shape, and texture of the artwork to draw out feelings within their audience. In fourth century B.C., artists within ancient Greece began to take a profound interest on how pathos can help us understand the external world. In Xenophon's Memorabilia, Socrates argues that art is able to portray the soul, and can capture human emotion. Famous plays like Sophocles' Oedipus Rex and Euripides' Medea were reliant on their ability to invent pathos in order to successfully capture the minds of the audience.

Political cartoons are but another more contemporary example of artists using pathos to persuade or bring to light issues within the world centering around the government. Most times, the designs are blown out of proportion and are greatly exaggerated, but this adds to the raw feeling the artist tries to evoke within the viewer.

== Pathos in music ==
In The Birth of Tragedy Out of the Spirit of Music the 19th century German philosopher Friedrich Nietzsche argues that, for the ancient Greeks, tragedy was a dramatic form of pathos (ecstatic or "primal suffering") which transcended language and could only be communicated through music. Drawing on Nietzsche's celebrated work, the British theorist and professor of philosophy Jason Barker argues that the same preoccupation with "musicality" as pathos, or "primal suffering", is the defining feature of contemporary popular music. Barker cites the example of the 1985 USA for Africa charity single "We Are the World", which he describes as "the birth of postmodern tragedy" and "marks the beginning of the so-called Disaster Appeal."

== See also ==
- Bread and circuses
- Catharsis
- Dukkha
- Pathetic fallacy
- Pathology
- Sensibility
- Sentimental novel
