= Kim Witte =

Kim Witte is a communications scholar with an emphasis on the area of fear appeals called “scare tactics”. In 2015 Witte is a professor who teaches graduate courses at Michigan State University.

== Early life and education ==
Witte received her Ph.D. at the University of California.

== Career ==
Witte has developed theories and written many notable papers on fear appeals in health risk messages. Witte's work has appeared in Social Science and Medicine, International Quarterly of Communication Health Education, Communication Yearbook, Health Education & Behavior, Communication Monographs, Journal of Community Health, and more. She has received several honors and awards on her accomplishments with the EPPM and in the health risk field.

Witte is the developer of the Extended Parallel Process Model. Witte's model is a guideline that researchers use to predict how individuals will react to fear by inducing stimuli. The guidelines considered in the EPPM are perceived threat, severity of the perceived threat, and perceived self-efficacy. She is also the developer of the Risk Behavior Diagnosis Scale, which indicates what prevention message would work best for a specific audience. Witte has research and developed this scale specifically with HIV/AIDS prevention messages. It is a 12-item scale to access the perceived threat by people in waiting rooms. The scale is based on EPPM.

Witte conducted a yearlong study at Johns Hopkins University.

=== Selected publications ===
- Witte, K. (1992). "Putting the fear back into fear appeals: The extended parallel process model". In this research paper, Witte explains the EPPM.
- Witte, K., Meyer, G., & Martell, D. (2001). Effective Health Risk Messages: A Step-by-Step Guide. Newbury Park, CA: Sage. Witte is the co-author of this book which is used as a text book in universities. The book is guide in effectively developing risk messages to specific audiences about health concerns.
- Witte, K. (1998). "Fear as Motivator, Fear as Inhibitor: Using the Extended Parallel Process Model to Explain Fear Appeal Successes and Failures" (pp. 423–450). In P. A. Andersen and L. K. Guerrero (Eds.), The Handbook of Communication and Emotion: Research, Theory, Applications, and Contexts. San Diego, CA: Academic Press. In this paper Witte makes slight changes to her original Extended Parallel Process Model. This research paper was published 6 years after the original.
