= Behavior change (public health) =

Efforts to change people's personal habits to prevent disease

Behavior change, in context of public health, refers to efforts put in place to change people's personal habits and attitudes, to prevent disease. Behavior change in public health can take place at several levels and is known as social and behavior change (SBC). More and more, efforts focus on prevention of disease to save healthcare care costs. This is particularly important in low and middle income countries, where supply side health interventions have come under increased scrutiny because of the cost.

== Aims ==
The 3-4-50 concept outlines that there are 3 behaviors (poor diet, little to no physical activity, and smoking), that lead to four diseases (heart disease/stroke, diabetes, cancer, pulmonary disease), that account for 50% of deaths worldwide. This is why so much emphasis in public health interventions have been on changing behaviors or intervening early on to decrease the negative impacts that come with these behaviors. With successful intervention, there is the possibility of decreasing healthcare costs by a drastic amount, as well as general costs to society (morbidity and mortality). A good public health intervention is not only defined by the results they create, but also the number of levels it hits on the socioecological model (individual, interpersonal, community and/or environment). The challenge that public health interventions face is generalizability: what may work in one community may not work in others. However, there is the development of Healthy People 2020 that has national objectives aimed to accomplish in 10 years to improve the health of all Americans.

Health conditions and infections are associated with risky behaviors. Tobacco use, alcoholism, multiple sex partners, substance use, reckless driving, obesity, or unprotected sexual intercourse are some examples. Human beings have, in principle, control over their conduct. Behavior modification can contribute to the success of self-control, and health-enhancing behaviors. Risky behaviors can be eliminated including physical exercise, weight control, preventive nutrition, dental hygiene, condom use, or accident prevention. Health behavior change refers to the motivational, volitional, and action based processes of abandoning such health-compromising behaviors in favor of adopting and maintaining health-enhancing behaviors. Addiction that is associated with risky behavior may have a genetic component.

== Theories ==
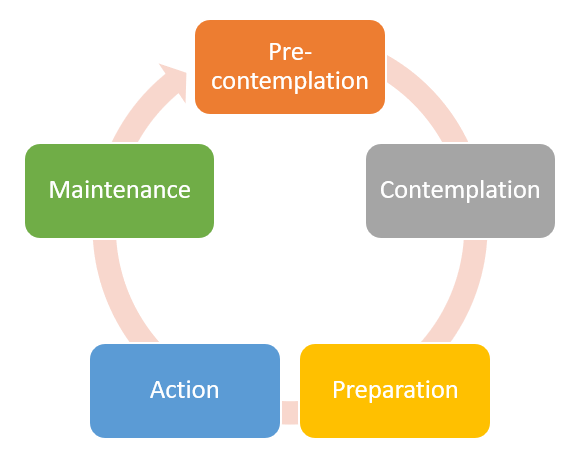
The transtheoretical model of behavioural change.

Behavior change programs tend to focus on a few behavioral change theories which gained ground in the 1980s. These theories share a major commonality in defining individual actions as the locus of change. Behavior change programs that are usually focused on activities that help a person or a community to reflect upon their risk behaviors and change them to reduce their risk and vulnerability are known as interventions. Examples include: "transtheoretical (stages of change) model of behavior change", "theory of reasoned action", "health belief model", "theory of planned behavior", diffusion of innovation", and the health action process approach. Developments in health behavior change theories since the late 1990s have focused on incorporating disparate theories of health behavior change into a single unified theory.

=== Individual and interpersonal ===
- Health belief model: It is a psychological model attempting to provide an explanation and prediction of health behaviors through a focus on the attitudes and beliefs of individuals. Based on the belief that the perception an individual has determines their success in taking on that behavior change. Factors: perceived susceptibility/severity/benefits/barriers, readiness to act, cues to action, and self-efficacy.
- Protection motivation theory: Focuses on understanding the fear appeal that mediates behavior change and describes how threat/coping appraisal is related to how adaptive or maladaptive when coping with a health threat. Factors: perceived severity, vulnerability, response efficacy.
- Transtheoretical model: This theory uses "stages of change" to create a nexus between powerful principles and processes of behavior change derived from leading theories of behavior change. Incorporates aspects of the integrative biopsychosocial model (CITE).
- Self-regulation theory: Embodies the belief that people have control over their own behavior change journey, as long as they have the resources and understanding to do so. Aims to create long-term effects for particular situations and contexts. Mainly focuses on stopping negative behaviors.
- Relapse prevention model: Focuses on immediate determinants and underhanded antecedent behaviors/factors that contribute and/or lead to relapse. Aims to identify high-risk situations and work with participants to cope with such conditions. Factors: self-efficacy, stimulus control.
- Behaviorist learning theory: Aims to understand prior context of behavior development that leads to certain consequences.
- Social cognitive theory: Explains behavior learning through observation and social contexts. Centered on the belief that behavior is a context of the environment through psychological processes. Factors: self-efficacy, knowledge, behavioral capability, goal setting, outcome expectations, observational learning, reciprocal determinism, reinforcement.
- Self-determination theory: Centers around support for natural and/or intrinsic tendencies with behavior and provides participants with healthy and effective ways to work with those. Factors: autonomy, competence, and skills.
- Theory of planned behavior: Aims to predict the specific plan of an individual to engage in a behavior (time and place), and apply to behaviors over which people have the ability to enact self-control over. Factors: behavioral intent, evaluation of risks and behavior.
- Health action process approach: HAPA suggests that the adoption, initiation, and maintenance of health behaviors should be conceived of as a structured process including a motivation phase and a volition phase. The former describes the intention formation while the latter refers to planning, and action (initiative, maintenance, recovery).

=== Community ===
- Community-based participatory research (CBPR): Utilizes community researcher partnership and collaboration. People in the designated community work with the researcher to play an active role as well as being the subjects of the study.
- Diffusion of innovations: Seeks to explain how new ideas and behaviors are communicated and spread throughout groups. Factors: relative advantage, compatibility, complexity, trial-ability, observability.

== Tools ==
=== Behavior change communication (BCC) ===
Behavior change communication, or BCC, is an approach to behavior change focused on communication. It is also known as social and behavior change communication, or SBCC. The assumptions is that through communication of some kind, individuals and communities can somehow be persuaded to behave in ways that will make their lives safer and healthier. BCC was first employed in HIV and TB prevention projects. More recently, its ambit has grown to encompass any communication activity whose goal is to help individuals and communities select and practice behavior that will positively impact their health, such as immunization, cervical cancer check up, employing single-use syringes, etc.

=== List of behavior change strategies ===
- Motivational interviewing
- Goal oriented technique for eliciting and strengthening intrinsic motivation for change.
- Behavioral contract
- Intent formation, making a commitment, being ready to change. (usually written)
- Knowledge
- Educational information through behavior, consequences and benefits, getting help, acquisition of skills.
- Behavioral capabilities
- Skill development through practice, modeling, imitation, reenacting, rehearsing.
- Choices
- Building autonomy and intrinsic motivation through relevance, interests and control
- Graded tasks
- Planning ahead
- Anticipate barriers
- Problem solving
- Self-reporting
- Self-adjustment
- Rewards
- Stimulus control
- Social support

=== Examples ===
- Organizations, foundations and programs
  - Johns Hopkins Center for Communication Programs specializes in health-related BCC (behavior change communication) programs, primarily in developing countries. It includes programs in reproductive health and family planning, malaria, and HIV/AIDS.
  - Development Media International uses mass media to promote healthy behaviors in Burkina Faso, DRC and Mozambique.
  - Young 1ove provides information to youth to reduce the spread of HIV/AIDS in Botswana.
  - Science of Behavior Change (SOBC) aims to promote basic research on the initiation, personalization, and maintenance of behavior change.
  - Chocolate Moose Media, founded by Firdaus Kharas in 1995, creates animated public service announcement content for health-and-social-justice behaviour change communications.
- Physical activity and diet: Look AHEAD (Action for Health in Diabetes), Shape-up Somerville, Diabetes Prevention Program (DPP)
- Quitting smoking: The Truth Initiative, Campaign for Tobacco-Free Kids, Family Smoking Prevention and Tobacco Control 2009
- Care groups are groups of 10–15 volunteer, community-based health educators who regularly meet together.
- Barrier analysis is a rapid assessment tool used in behavior change projects to identify behavioral determinants.
- Community-led total sanitation is a behaviour change tool used in the sanitation sector for mainly rural settings in developing countries with the aim to stop open defecation. The method uses shame, disgust and to some extent peer pressure which leads to the "spontaneous" construction and long-term use of toilets after an initial triggering process has taken place.

== See also ==
- Behavior change methods
- Behavioural change theories
- Design for behavior change
- Global Handwashing Day
- Lifestyle medicine
- Nudge theory
