= Intervention mapping =

Health promotion program design process

Intervention Mapping is an approach for developing theory-based and evidence-based health promotion programs. Intervention Mapping describes the process of health promotion program planning in six steps:

1. the needs and assets assessment based on the PRECEDE-PROCEED model
2. the definition of intervention outcomes and objectives based upon scientific analyses of health problems and problem causing factors;
3. the selection of intervention methods and translating them into practical applications to change (determinants of) health-related behavior;
4. the intervention design and production;
5. the anticipation of adoption, implementation and sustainability; and
6. the anticipation of process and effect evaluation.

Intervention Mapping is characterized by three perspectives: an ecological approach, participation of all stakeholders, and the use of theories and evidence. Although Intervention Mapping is presented as a series of steps, the authors see the planning process as iterative rather than linear. Program planners move back and forth between tasks and steps. The process is also cumulative: each step is based on previous steps, and inattention to a particular step may lead to mistakes and inadequate decisions.

== Brief history and purpose of the approach ==
Intervention Mapping was first developed and introduced in 1998 by L. Kay Bartholomew, Guy S. Parcel & Gerjo Kok, with an article in Health Education & Behavior. In 2001 the first edition of the book followed, with Nell H. Gottlieb as 4th author. In 2006, the 2nd edition was published, and in 2011, the 3rd edition, with Maria E. Fernández as 5th author. The 4th edition appeared in 2016, authored by L. Kay Bartholomew Eldridge, Christine M. Markham, Robert A.C. Ruiter, Maria Fernández, Gerjo Kok & Guy S. Parcel. This was the last edition led by L. Kay Bartholomew Eldridge, who died in February 2016.

Intervention Mapping was developed as a reaction to a lack of comprehensive frameworks for health promotion program development. Intervention Mapping aims to help health promoters develop the best possible intervention. The key words in this approach are planning, research, and theory. Intervention Mapping provides a vocabulary for intervention planning, procedures for planning activities, and technical assistance with identifying determinants and methods for change. Intervention Mapping can also help in adapting existing interventions to new populations and settings, and provides a taxonomy of behavior change methods that can be used to develop interventions. In the health promotion field, Intervention Mapping has successfully been applied in various settings, to a wide range of different behaviors and populations. It may help planners develop theory- and evidence-based interventions to promote healthy behavior.

More specifically, Intervention Mapping ensures that theoretical models and empirical evidence guide planners in two areas: (1) the identification of behavioral and environmental determinants related to a target problem, and (2) the selection of the most appropriate theoretical methods and practical applications to address the identified determinants. Intervention Mapping has been described as elaborate. However, this is crucial to bring the development of interventions to a higher level, indicating that advantages outweighed disadvantages. Intervention Mapping is developed in the health promotion field but can easily be applied in other fields, such as promoting energy conservation.

== Steps and tasks ==
Are the following:

- Step 1: Needs and Assets Assessment
  - Establish a planning group
  - Conduct a needs assessment and assets assesment
  - Describe the context for the intervention including the community, population, and setting
  - State intervention goals
- Step 2: Intervention Outcomes and Objectives
  - State desired behavioral and environmental outcomes
  - Specify performance objectives for behavioral and environmental outcomes
  - Select determinants for behavioral and environmental outcomes
  - Construct matrices of change objectives
- Step 3: Methods and Practical Applications
  - Generate intervention ideas with the planning group
  - Choose theory- and evidence-based change methods
  - Select or design practical applications to deliver change methods
- Step 4: Intervention Design and Production
  - Define intervention structure (themes, components, scope, and sequence)
  - Plan intervention messages, materials, and activities
  - Produce intervention materials, activities, and protocols
  - Pretest, refine, and finalize materials, activities, and protocols
- Step 5: Implementation Mapping
  - Conduct an implementation needs and assets assessment and identify program implementers
  - Identify implementation performance objectives and determinants to create matrices of change objectives
  - Choose change methods and design implementation strategies
  - Produce implementation protocols and materials
  - Evaluate implementation outcomes
- Step 6: Evaluation Plan
  - Review the logic model of change, matrices, and implementation plan to guide process and effect evaluation
  - Develop process evaluation questions and identify measures
  - Develop effect evaluation questions, select a design, and identify measures
  - Pilot test the intervention and finalize evaluation plan
  - Plan when and how to report evaluation findings

== See also ==
- Behavior change (public health)
- Behavioural change theories
- Health psychology
