= Applied Psychology: Health and Well-Being =

- Discipline: Applied Psychology
- Language: English
- Edited by: Ralf Schwarzer, Aleksandra Luszczynska

Publication details
- History: 2009–present
- Publisher: Wiley-Blackwell on behalf of the International Association of Applied Psychology
- Frequency: Triannually

Standard abbreviations
- ISO 4: Appl. Psychol.: Health Well-Being
- NLM: Appl Psychol Health Well Being

Indexing
- ISSN: 1758-0846 (print); 1758-0854 (web)
- LCCN: 2009243274
- OCLC no.: 712800447

Links
- Journal homepage; Online access; Online archive

Applied Psychology: Health and Well-Being is a triannual peer-reviewed academic journal published by Wiley-Blackwell on behalf of the International Association of Applied Psychology. It was established in 2009 and covers applied psychology topics such as clinical psychology, counseling, cross-cultural psychology, and environmental psychology.

According to the Journal Citation Reports, the journal has a 2018 impact factor of 1.946, ranking it 38th out of 82 journals in the category "Psychology, Applied".

== See also ==
- List of psychology journals
