= Ralf Schwarzer =

Psychology professor

Ralf Schwarzer (born 1943) is a Psychologist. He is a professor emeritus of psychology at the Freie University of Berlin, Germany. He is known for the exploration of diverse psychological dimensions, including stress, coping mechanisms, social support, self-efficacy, well-being, positive psychology, and health behavior change. Notably, he has contributed to the field through the formulation of the Health Action Process Approach (HAPA), a theoretical framework in the realm of health behavior.

== Biography ==
Schwarzer earned his Ph.D. in 1973 from Kiel University. He was appointed professor of education in 1974 in Schwäbisch-Gmünd, followed by similar appointments in 1976 in Aachen and, ultimately, as a professor of psychology in 1982 at Freie University Berlin.

Schwarzer embarked on sabbatical leaves, notably at the University of California, Berkeley, in 1985, and later in Los Angeles during 1990–1991. He assumed the role of visiting professor at The Chinese University of Hong Kong (1994–1995) and at York University, Canada, in 1998, where he merited the position of adjunct professor.

From 2011 to 2024, he was affiliated with the University of Social Sciences and Humanities (USWPS) in Wroclaw, Poland. Simultaneously, his scholarly pursuits extended to Australia, where from 2014 to 2017, he served as a part-time professor at the Institute for Positive Psychology and Education, Australian Catholic University, Sydney, Australia.

Schwarzer co-founded three journals "Anxiety, Stress, and Coping: An International Journal," "Zeitschrift für Gesundheitspsychologie," and "Applied Psychology: Health and Well-Being," where he served as the Editor-in-Chief.

== Honors and awards ==
- John F. Diefenbaker Research Award by the Canada Council in 1995.
- STAR Lifetime Career Award from the Stress and Anxiety Research Society (STAR) in 1999.
- Distinguished Scientific Contributions by the International Association of Applied Psychology (IAAP) in 2010.

== Selected books ==
- Schwarzer, R. (Ed.). (1990). Gesundheitspsychologie: Ein Lehrbuch [Health psychology: A textbook]. Göttingen: Hogrefe.
- Schwarzer, R., & Wicklund, R. (Eds.). (1991). Anxiety and self-focused attention. Chur/London: Harwood Academic Publishers.
- Schwarzer, R. (1992). Psychologie des Gesundheitsverhaltens [Psychology of health behaviors]. Göttingen, Germany: Hogrefe.
- Schwarzer, R. (Ed.). (1992). Self-efficacy: Thought control of action. Washington, DC: Hemisphere.
- Schwarzer, R. (1993). Streß, Angst und Handlungsregulation [Stress, anxiety and action regulation] (3rd rev. ed.). Stuttgart, Germany: Kohlhammer.
