= Youth Impact =

- Formation: January 1, 2014; 12 years ago
- Type: AIDS education, Quality Education
- Location: Botswana
- Region served: Botswana
- Website: www.youth-impact.org

Youth Impact is a non-governmental organization based in Gaborone, Botswana, that scales evidence-based programs in health and education. The mission is to connect youth with proven life-saving information, and Youth Impact has reached over 100,000 young people. Youth Impact currently runs two programs: Zones and Teaching at the Right Level.

The flagship program, Zones, encourages young people to safely date age-mates instead of riskier older partners. The program was inspired by a 1-hour class delivered in Kenya and shown through a randomized control trial to reduce adolescent pregnancy rates, a proxy for unprotected sex and HIV transmission, by 28 percent. Youth Impact revitalized the evidence-based program and delivered it in Botswana with Tirelo Sechaba participants as program facilitators. In 2015, Youth Impact conducted a randomized control trial to test if the program still worked in the Botswana context. The trial involved 343 schools across the county. Results from the RCT showed that more adaptations are necessary before scaling up the program to the entire region; Youth Impact is currently using the results to design the highest-impact program possible.

The second program, Teaching at the Right Level, is a remedial education program developed by Pratham to assist students who are falling behind curriculum expectations. The intervention has been shown in over six randomized control trials to demonstrate robust impact across contexts and implementation models. The approach evaluates student proficiency using a 1-page assessment tool and then groups students according to their learning level instead of age or grade. After re-grouping students, youth facilitators use fun, level-tailored activities during a 30-day after school class to teach students at their level. Teaching students at their ability rather than grade level curriculum is shown to be one of the most cost-effective interventions at improving basic literacy and numeracy.

The third program was launched as part of Youth Impact's COVID-19 response. In March 2020, schools around the world closed in response to the COVID-19 pandemic, exacerbating an already tenuous learning crisis. Worldwide, an estimated 617 million school-age youth are unable to reach minimum proficiency levels in basic reading and mathematics (UIS, 2017). If learning levels were already low while schools were open, the additional loss of in-person instruction will likely leave students even further behind. With as many as 1.6 billion learners out of school, the COVID-19 pandemic greatly underscored the need for adaptable, resilient distance education models (UNESCO 2020). Less than 40% of households in low- and middle-income countries have internet capacity or 3G mobile networks required of typical ‘high-tech’ distance learning options (Center for Global Development 2020). Without the necessary infrastructure and technology, many of these solutions have limited success in these contexts (UNESCO 2020; Beuermann et al. 2015). Therefore, a simple and accessible solution is necessary to support distance learning in the hardest to reach populations and ensure that these children do not suffer disproportionately. Given that 70–90% of low- and middle-income households own at least one mobile phone, Youth Impact developed a remote numeracy intervention that leverages this widely available, yet previously underutilized, platform for educational support. Using simple phone calls and one-way SMS messages, Youth Impact was able to reach households with impactful tutorials with targeted content to improve learning.

Youth Impact ran a Randomized Controlled Trial in Botswana, which provided some of the first and only experimental evidence on the potential for low-tech m-Learning interventions in remote environments, showed that the intervention limited immediate learning loss when there is a lack of other educational instruction. It also showed potential for low-tech platforms to drive persistent learning gains over several months, perhaps as supplements to regular schooling. Among students receiving both phone calls and SMS messages, we saw a 31% decrease in innumeracy. The approach has generated significant attention from global stakeholders and partners and has been cited by the Global Education Evidence Advisory Panel as a "Smart Buy" for improving global learning levels. The approach has been adapted and trialed in six countries to date (Botswana, Kenya, India, Nepal, the Philippines, and Uganda) reaching over 25,000 students and generating some of the fastest, largest-scale multi-country evidence in education.

Youth Impact's programs are run in partnership with the Botswana government, as well as other governments around the world.

Note: Youth Impact was previously called Young 1ove and was renamed on March 22, 2022, the date of the organization's 8th anniversary to reflect its growth from one health program to three programs in both health and education, and to fully capture the organization youth and evidence-focused mission in its name.

== See also ==
- Behavior change (public health)
- Education in Africa
