= Extended parallel process model =

How individuals react to fear-inducing messages

The extended parallel process model (EPPM) is a fear appeal theory developed by communications scholar Kim Witte that illustrates how individuals react to fear-inducing messages. Witte subsequently published an initial test of the model in Communication Monographs.

The EPPM was developed by Witte as a response to the significant inconsistencies in fear appeal literature, serving as an extension of previous fear appeal models, hence the use of 'extended' in name 'EPPM'. The model is originally based on Leventhal's Parallel Process Model – a danger and fear control framework that studied how adaptive protective behaviour stemmed from attempts of danger control. It also significantly draws from Roger's Protection motivation theory, which proposes two responses to fear-inducing stimuli: threat appraisal and coping appraisal.

The model's main theory is that when confronted with a fear-inducing stimulus, humans tend to engage in two simultaneous ways of message processing: a perceived efficacy appraisal (cognitive processing) and a perceived threat appraisal (emotional processing). Differences in message appraisal then lead to two behavioural outcomes, with individuals engaging in either a danger control process or a fear control process. In the case of the message being perceived as having no element of threat, individuals do not exhibit a response, and the message is ignored. The EPPM states that the danger control process leads to behavioural change, while the fear control process does not.

Witte's EPPM expands on previous fear appeal studies by explaining the reasons for failure in fear appeals and reincorporating fear as a central variable in the model. This is also the first fear appeal model that outlines the relationship between threat and efficacy in propositional forms.

The EPPM concludes that a fear control process leads to message rejection, while a danger control process leads to message acceptance, leading to adaptive behavioural changes.

== Background ==
Witte's motivations for designing an updated fear appeal model was due to the declining role of fear in fear appeals. While initially, fear was the pinnacle of theoretical fear appeal literature, it was starting to be considered as a control variable in subsequent models. A lack of precision in the Parallel Process Model and empirical inconsistencies in the Protection Motivation Theory were also noted by Witte as reasons for formulating an extended parallel process model.

Two main components of large-scale public messaging that induce behavioural change are fear appeals and fear appraisals. Fear appeals are specifically designed to elicit fear and nudge individuals to adapt to the recommendations in the message. They find their use in public health campaigns and political adverts, and are designed to fit three main categories: message, behaviour, and the audience.

- Message: The content that is included in the fear-inducing message
- Behaviour: The behavioural response recommended by the message
- Audience: The characteristics of the audience receiving the message

Fear appraisals are the mental evaluations made in response to experiencing fear-inducing stimuli and are also known as threat appraisals. Fear appeal literature is primarily focused on understanding key fear appraisal processes in humans, with the intention of using it to drive social campaigns and behavioural interventions.

== Components ==
The EPPM uses persuasive fear-inducing messages to induce intended behavioural responses. Witte details three main processes involved in fear appraisal: the fear appeal inputs, the message processing of the inputs, and the outputs, or action taken after evaluating the perceived threat.

=== Fear appeal inputs ===
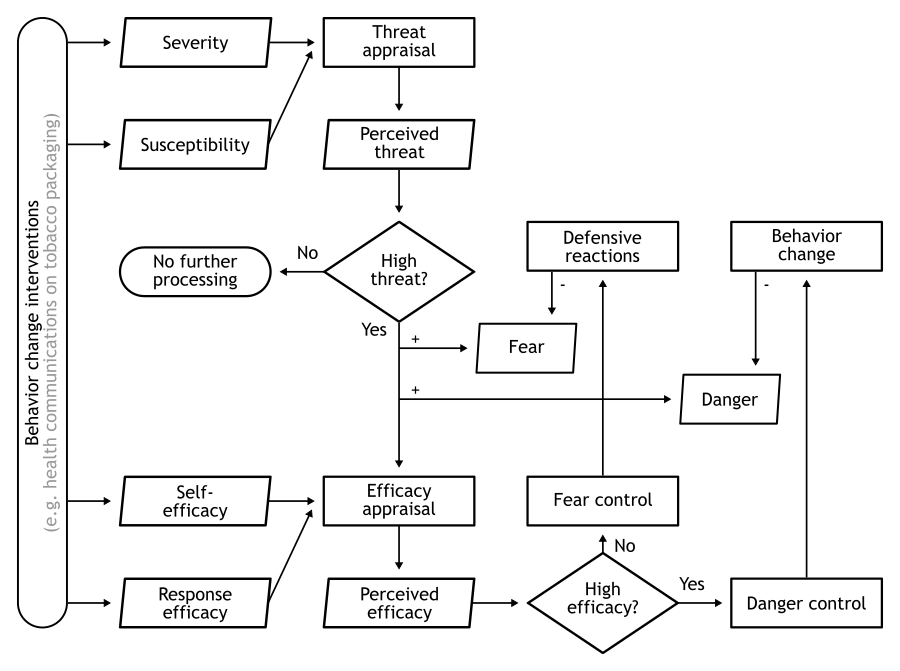
Illustration of the Extended Parallel Process Model.

According to fear appeal studies, a fear appeal has two components: a component of threat and a component of efficacy. These two components are further divided into two categories each. The threat component is composed of severity and susceptibility, while the efficacy component is composed of response efficacy and self-efficacy.

These four key factors, as defined by the EPPM, predict the likely outcome of communications that involve a fear appeal.

Threat variables

- Susceptibility – The perception the individual has of how likely the threat is to impact them.
- Severity – The perception the individual has of the magnitude of the threat.

Efficacy variables

- Self-efficacy – The perception the individual has that they are competent to perform the tasks needed to control the risk.
- Response efficacy – The perception the individual has that the action, if carried out, will successfully control the risk.

The outcome of fear appeals is determined by an appraisal, that is, the evaluation of the message as either dangerous or indifferent.

=== Fear appraisal ===
Appraisal Theory states that an individual makes either an emotional or affective response to external stimuli. The EPPM outlines two primary appraisals an individual makes in response to a fear appeal: a threat appraisal, followed by an efficacy appraisal.

Low threat appraisal
When a threat appraisal is perceived to be low, i.e., there is a lack of imminent threat, the fear appeal is rejected immediately.
Moderate to High threat appraisal
When a threat appraisal is perceived as moderate or high, fear is induced, and individuals begin the efficacy appraisal.
Low efficacy appraisal
When the efficacy appraisal is perceived to be low, the message does not induce behavioural change.
Moderate to High efficacy appraisal
When the efficacy appraisal is perceived as moderate or high, the message induces a behavioural change.

After appraisals of the fear appeal, individuals then take action based on whether the threat is imminent or trivial.

=== Fear Appeal Outputs ===
The EPPM predicts three possible outputs after the fear appraisal is carried out:

Danger control
When an individual perceives that the severity and susceptibility are high (i.e., high threat appraisal) and also perceives that they are competent to take mitigating action (i.e., high efficacy appraisal), then they are likely to act to control the danger.
Fear control
The model predicts that if an individual perceives their ability to control risk as low, even if the severity and susceptibility are perceived as high, they are likely to take steps to control their fear instead. Fear control responses are defined as coping mechanisms that reduce fear and include denial, psychological reactance and defensive avoidance. These are maladaptive changes, or counterproductive behaviours. Fear controlling behaviour may involve the use of cognitive defence mechanisms such as "It will happen to me sooner or later", in order to manage the state of anxiety.
No Response
The severity or susceptibility of the danger is perceived as low, and the individual rejects the message. There is no behavioural change.

== Applications ==
The EPPM model is mainly used in social and behaviour change communication (SBCC). Practitioners design a general communications program, such as a campaign or an advert, and then test the effectiveness of the program through implementation. SBCC methods in healthcare, education, and marketing have employed the EPPM to induce behavioural change in patients and customers.

Multiple versions of the EPPM are employed in health campaigns. For example, EPPM-based campaigns have helped increase colorectal cancer screening participation among young adults and increased HPV vaccination interest among LatinX.

Other usages of EPPM lie in shaping public perceptions, such as in political adverts, climate change messages, and pandemic responses.

== Criticisms ==
While the EPPM has been effective in health campaigns and behavioural change interventions, there are limitations that have been pointed out through rigorous meta-analytical studies.

Reviews have highlighted the many applications of the EPPM model in its 20 years since initial publication but significant theoretical questions on the operationalization of key constructs remain and not all of its hypotheses have received empirical support.

Lucy Popova's 'The Extended Parallel Process Model: Illuminating the Gaps in Research', is an extensive review on the theoretical and empirical applications of the EPPM. Popova discovered that the strong theoretical foundations has some inconsistencies in a few of its operational definitions. A systematic review of existing literature on EPPMs found that its propositions had no clear empirical support. The outcomes of fear appeals differ slightly from what the EPPM claims. This questions the practical validity of the EPPM.

== See also ==
- Social and behaviour change communication – Communication strategies designed to create positive behavioural interventions
- Behavioural change theories – Theories that attempt to use wide explanations to predict why human behaviours change
- Theory of planned behavior – The idea that an individual's beliefs shape their behavioural intentions
