= Protection motivation theory =

Psychological model related to fear

Protection motivation theory (PMT) was originally created to help understand individual human responses to fear appeals. Protection motivation theory proposes that people protect themselves based on two factors: threat appraisal and coping appraisal. Threat appraisal assesses the severity of the situation and examines how serious the situation is, while coping appraisal is how one responds to the situation. Threat appraisal consists of the perceived severity of a threatening event and the perceived probability of the occurrence, or vulnerability. Coping appraisal consists of perceived response efficacy, or an individual's expectation that carrying out the recommended action will remove the threat, and perceived self efficacy, or the belief in one's ability to execute the recommended courses of action successfully.

PMT is one model that explains why people engage in unhealthy practices and offers suggestions for changing those behaviors.

Another psychological model that describes self-preservation and processing of fear is terror management theory.

== History ==
Protection motivation theory was developed by R.W. Rogers in 1975 in order to better understand fear appeals and how people cope with them. However, Dr. Rogers would later expand on the theory in 1983 to a more general theory of persuasive communication. The theory was originally based on the work of Richard Lazarus, who researched how people behave and cope during stressful situations. In his book, Stress, Appraisal, and Coping, Richard Lazarus discusses the idea of the cognitive appraisal processes and how they relate to coping with stress. He states that people "differ in their sensitivity and vulnerability to certain types of events, as well as in their interpretations and reactions".

=== Threat-appraisal process ===
The threat appraisal process consists of both the severity and vulnerability of the situation. It focuses on the source of the threat and factors that increase or decrease likelihood of maladaptive behaviours.

=== Coping-appraisal process ===
The coping appraisal consists of the response efficacy, self-efficacy, and the response costs. Response efficacy is the effectiveness of the recommended behavior in removing or preventing possible harm. Self-efficacy is the belief that one can successfully enact the recommended behavior. The response costs are the costs associated with the recommended behavior. The amount of coping ability that one experiences is the combination of response efficacy and self-efficacy, minus the response costs. The coping appraisal process focuses on the adaptive responses and one's ability to cope with and avert the threat. The coping appraisal is the sum of the appraisals of the responses efficacy and self-efficacy, minus any physical or psychological "costs" of adopting the recommended preventive response. Coping Appraisal involves the individual's assessment of the response efficacy of the recommended behavior (i.e. perceived effectiveness of sunscreen in preventing premature aging) as well as one's perceived self-efficacy in carrying out the recommended actions.

In Stress, Appraisal, and Coping, Richard Lazarus states that, "studies of coping suggest that different styles of coping are related to specific health outcomes; control of anger, for example, has been implicated in hypertension. Three routes through which coping can affect health include the frequency, intensity, duration, and patterning of neurochemical stress reactions; using injurious substances or carrying out activities that put the person at risk; and impeding adaptive health/illness-related behavior.".

=== Response efficacy ===
Response efficacy concerns beliefs that adopting a particular behavioral response will be effective in reducing the diseases' threat, and self-efficacy is the belief that one can successfully perform the coping response. In line with the traditional way of measuring the consequences of behavior, response efficacy was operationalized by linking consequences to the recommended behavior as well as to whether the subject regarded the consequences as likely outcomes of the recommended behavior. Among the 6 factors (vulnerability, severity, rewards, response efficacy, self-efficacy, and response costs), self-efficacy is the most correlated with protection motivation, according to meta-analysis studies.

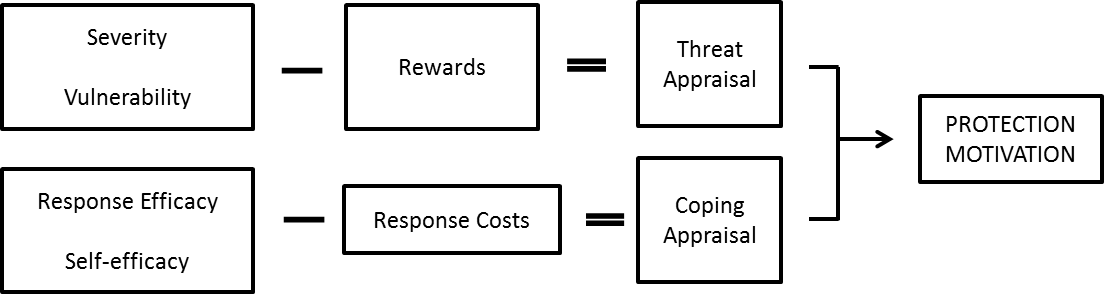
Cognitive process of protection motivation theory developed by Ronald W. Rogers in 1983

== Applications ==
=== Measures ===
Each influential factor is generally measured by asking questions through a survey. For example, Boer (2005) studied on intention of condom use to prevent from getting AIDS guided by protection motivation theory. The study asked the following questions to individuals: "If I do not use condoms, I will run a high risk of getting HIV/AIDS." for vulnerability, "If I became infected with HIV or get AIDS, I would suffer from all kind of ailments." for severity, "Using condoms will protect me against becoming infected with HIV." for response efficacy, and "I am able to talk about safe sex with my boyfriend/girlfriend."

=== Applied research areas ===
Protection motivation theory conventionally has been applied in the personal health contexts. A meta-analysis study on protection motivation theory categorized major six topics: cancer prevention (17%), exercise/diet/healthy lifestyle (17%), smoking (9%), AIDS prevention (9%), alcohol consumption (8%), and adherence to medical-treatment regimens (6%).

Aside from personal physical health research, the application of protection motivation theory has extended to other areas. Namely, researchers focusing on information security have applied protection motivation theory to their studies since the end of the 2000s. The general idea here has been to use threats or information security policies to encourage protection security behaviors in the workplace and at home. Accordingly, a more recent security application of protection motivation theory by Boss et al. (2015), returned to use of the full nomology and measurement of fear in an organizational security context with two studies. A process-variance model of protection motivation theory was strongly supported in this context, as depicted in Figure 1.

== See also ==
- Behavioural change theories
- Health communication, a field which commonly applies protection motivation theory
- Terror management theory
