= Barrier analysis =

Assessment tool in behavior change projects

Barrier Analysis is a rapid assessment tool used in behavior change projects. The purpose of Barrier Analysis is to identify behavioral determinants of a particular behaviour so that more effective social and behavioral change messages, strategies, and supporting activities can be developed. Barrier Analysis is a relatively easy to use approach that can be conducted in a short period of time, allowing implementers to quickly make decisions based on the findings. This method has been used in 39 organizations and agencies (including UNICEF and many INGOs) in 59 countries. The training manual is available in English, Spanish, French, and Arabic.

== History ==
Barrier Analysis (BA) was developed in 1990 by Tom Davis, MPH, winner of the 2012 APHA Gordon-Wyon Award for Community-Oriented Public Health, Epidemiology, and Practice. BA was popularized by both Bonnie Kittle MPH and Davis, both of whom were awarded the Dory Storm Child Survival Recognition Award in part due to their work on this tool. BA is based on the health belief model and the theory of reasoned action. Since then, it has been adopted by at least 39 organizations working in 59 countries around the world (57 of which are LMICs) to study determinants of behaviors related to health, nutrition, WASH, agriculture/food security, education, child protection, sexual and reproductive health, injury prevention (e.g. explosive ordnance risk education), city planning, and other thematic areas. The methodology has continued to evolve as it has been tested in different settings. It has primarily been used for international development, although it has also been used and taught in the developed world as well (e.g., by the Baltimore City Government for analysis of trash can use, Feed the Children and Hunger Free NYC to look at participation in the USDA summer meals program, and the Honey Bee Health Coalition). In 2020 and 2021, multiple organizations used Barrier Analysis to study barriers and enablers to COVID-19 vaccine acceptance. Barrier Analysis has been used in at least one US hospital setting: Boston Medical Center staff conducted a Barrier Analysis to study why some women with a prior spontaneous preterm delivery (SPTD) have serial cervical ultrasounds and counseling for progesterone in their subsequent pregnancies and others do not. Solutions that were applied based on the results of the BA led to cost savings of USD 2.47 million annually. Boston Hospital also conducted a BA on aspirin adherence in pregnant women at risk for preeclampsia. Results summaries for these Barrier Analysis studies on COVID-19 vaccine acceptance in Bangladesh, DRC, India, Myanmar, Kenya, and Tanzania are publicly available. A bibliography of most published BA studies can be found here.

== Usage ==
Barrier analysis can be used at the start of a behavior change program to determine key messages and activities for intervention. It can also be used in an ongoing program, focusing on behaviors that have not changed in order to understand what is stopping it from happening.

== Methodology ==
The purpose of barrier analysis is to identify determinants of behavior change among a specific target audience. The four most commonly found determinants are Perceived Self-efficacy, Perceived Social Norms, Perceived Positive Consequences, and Perceived Negative Consequences. Additional determinants that are studied include Perceived Severity, Perceived Susceptibility/Risk, Perceived Action Efficacy, Perceived Divine Will, Cues for Action/Reminders, Access, Policy & Culture. Typically researchers interview 45 "Doers" (people who already practice the behavior) and 45 "Non-doers" (people who do not practice the behavior) and compare the responses. When this 45/45 samples is used, a difference of 15 percentage points or greater between the two interviewee categories is usually statistically significant, but a special BA Tabulation Table is used to test for statistical significance.

The main steps in a Barrier Analysis study are: 1. A behavior is chosen for study. This is usually a behaviour that is expected to lead to significant positive impact or outcomes if adopted and one where high adoption levels have been elusive in a particular population despite past promotion of the behavior. 2. A standard BA questionnaire including both open-ended and closed-ended questions is used to create a BA questionnaire to study the particular behavior using this guidance. The first few questions are used to identify "Doers" and "Non-doers" of the behaviour being studied, and the remaining questions are based on twelve different behavioural determinants. Sometimes questions that correspond to additional determinants are added based on a literature review (e.g. adding questions on perceived trust and safety for a BA on COVID-19 vaccines). 3. Interviews are conducted with 45 or more Doers and 45 or more Non-doers of the behavior. Interviews can be conducted over the phone, in person, or using an online survey. 4. Results are tabulated, usually by enumerators or program staff. 5. Results are then entered into an easy-to-use MS Excel Barrier Analysis Tabulation Table. This spreadsheet generates Odds Ratios, Estimated Relative Risks, and p-values so that users can see which differences between Doers and Non-doers are statistically-significant and the degree of association between particular responses and the behavior. Results statements are automatically generated in the spreadsheet (e.g. "Doers are 4.2 times more likely to give this response than Non-doers"). 6. Staff/stakeholders use the findings on significant differences between Doers and Non-doers to create useful messages and activities that leverage enablers and reduce barriers to adoption of the behaviour being studied. (Instructions for this step are included in Lesson #13 of the Practical Guide to Conducting a Barrier Analysis.) Monitoring indicators can be developed to track changes in the key determinants.
