= Public health intervention =

Government effort or policy that attempts to improve public health

A public health intervention is any effort, policy, or program intended to improve health (mental, physical, emotional, spiritual, social, etc.) at the population level. Interventions may involve social movements that strive to support public health at different levels of society. Interventions can be personal, community-level, national, and global. Common types of interventions include screening programs, vaccination, food and water supplementation, and health promotion. Common issues that are the subject of public health interventions include obesity, drug, tobacco, and alcohol use, and the spread of infectious disease, e.g. HIV. Public health interventions are distinct from healthcare interventions in terms of their scope, methods, and objectives. Specifically, public health information tends to focus on population-level information and preventative measures while healthcare interventions tend to focus on the individual, though both are highly interconnected and necessarily complementary.

Public health interventions may be run by a variety of organizations, including governmental health departments and non-governmental organizations (NGOs). A policy may meet the criteria of a public health intervention if it prevents disease on both the individual and community level and has a positive impact on public health.

== History ==
The origins of public health interventions originated with early efforts in disease surveillance, quantification of illness, and intervention implementation. These interventions further expanded to analyze the efficacy of various approaches. As urbanization and community life increased, the need for organized health protection grew. Over time, public health strategies have evolved to involve both public and private sectors, often working together to intervene in human rights issues related to health. Despite advances in healthcare access and coverage, social inequalities continue to impact equitable health. Inequality, war, and infectious diseases contribute to the need for public health interventions.

== Types ==
Health interventions may be run by a variety of organizations, including health departments and private organizations. Such interventions can operate at various scales, but these interventions do not reach individuals simultaneously or to equal extent. The whole population can be reached via websites, audio/video messages and other mass media, or specific groups can be affected by administrative action, such as increasing the provision of healthy food at schools.

=== Screening ===
Screening refers to the practice of testing a set of individuals who meet a certain criteria (such as age, sex, or sexual activity) for a disease or disorder. Many forms of screening are public health interventions. For example, mothers are routinely screened for HIV and Hepatitis B during pregnancy. Detection during pregnancy can prevent maternal transmission of the disease during childbirth.

=== Vaccination ===
Vaccination programs are one of the most effective and common types of public health interventions. Typically programs may be in the form of recommendations or run by governmental health departments or nationalised health care systems. For instance, in the U.S., the Center for Disease Control decides on a vaccination schedule, and most private health insurers cover these vaccinations. In the UK, the NHS both decides and implements vaccination protocols. NGOs also may be involved in funding or implementing vaccination programs; for instance Bill and Melinda Gates Foundation assists governments in Pakistan, Nigeria and Afghanistan with the administration of polio vaccination. Vaccine related public health interventions may also involve improving access to vaccination. For example, during the COVID-19 pandemic, public health officials started the "Shots at the Shop" initiative, which taught barbers and stylists how to deliver health information about the vaccine while also offering vaccinations within barbershops itself.

=== Supplementation ===
Supplementation of food or water of nutrients can reduce vitamin deficiency and other diseases. Supplementation may be required by law or voluntary. Some examples of interventions include:

- Iodised salt to prevent goitre.
- Folic acid in wheat flour to prevent spina bifida, a birth defect.
- Fluoridated water to prevent tooth decay.
- Vitamin D milk to prevent rickets.

=== Behavioural ===
Interventions intended to change the behaviour of individuals can be especially challenging. One such form is health promotion, where education and media may be used to promote healthy behaviours, such as eating healthy foods (to prevent obesity), using condoms (to prevent the transmission of STDs), or stopping open defecation in developing countries (see for example in India the campaign Swachh Bharat Mission).

The use of laws to criminalise certain behaviours can also be considered a public health intervention, such as mandatory vaccination programs and criminalisation of HIV transmission. However, such measures are typically controversial, particularly in the case of HIV criminalisation where there is evidence it may be counter productive. Laws which tax certain unhealthy products may also be effective, although also not without controversy, and are sometimes called a "sin tax". Examples include the taxation of tobacco products in the U.S. and New Zealand, and sugared drinks in the UK.

=== Structural ===
Structural interventions address underlying social, political, and economic determinants of health. These efforts often account for the influence of culture and societal values on health outcomes. Structural interventions promote public health by altering systemic conditions and social norms. Such efforts may involve institutional reforms, the redistribution of resources, and the expansion of healthcare accessibility. A key focus is reducing disparities resulting from unequal distributions of resources and power, with particular attention to improving health outcomes among marginalized populations.

=== Educational ===
Educational public health interventions address the "information gap" that many public health issues have. Specifically, they try to improve overall health systems by promoting the understanding of health-related behaviors and disease prevention, among other topics. With the advent of technology, these interventions oftentimes occur within digital formats as well as physical initiatives. Similar to other types of interventions, educational interventions can be done by governmental initiatives or NGOs. Some examples of educational interventions include:

- Educating the public on disease prevention methods like washing hands
- Community workshops around pregnancy needs in rural areas
- Training Chicago high school students on health information to try to improve health equity in local communities
- Utilizing Black churches to increase community health outreach information

== Impact ==
Health impacts can be sorted and displayed as a pyramid with five levels of intervention; the interventions at the base of the pyramid have the greatest population impact and require less individual effort; the higher tier interventions have the least population impact and require the most individual effort to prevent negative health outcomes and promote positive health outcomes:

- Level 5 Counselling and education
- Level 4 Clinical interventions
- Level 3 Long-lasting protective interventions
- Level 2 Changing the context to make individuals' default decisions healthy
- Level 1 Socioeconomic factors: (poverty reduction, improved education

== Global public health ==
Global public health experienced significant transformation in the early 20th century, particularly with the involvement of institutions such as the Rockefeller Foundation (RF). The RF established new frameworks that transcended narrow political and economic self interest. The RF shaped other health organizations and spearheaded the establishment of public health schools and disease campaigns. It contributed to the creation of national public health departments around the world and institutionalized international health.

In 1946, the World Health Organization (WHO) founded to serve as a permanent international health agency. Its creation supported the professionalization of the global health field and facilitated the coordination of international health interventions. The WHO's early efforts supported the development of global health interventions through mandates focused on data collection, epidemiological surveillance, training, research, and greater resource mobilization.

== Evaluating efficacy ==
Evaluating and predicting the efficacy of a public health intervention, as well as calculating cost effectiveness, is essential. An intervention should ideally lower morbidity and mortality. Several systematic protocols exist to assist developing such interventions, such as Intervention Mapping. The effectiveness of public health interventions can be assessed through measurable outcomes, particularly in disease-specific interventions. For example, interventions addressing sexually transmitted infections are commonly evaluated using indicators such as transmission dynamics, disease severity, and treatment and prevention likelihood. Evaluation methodologies vary depending on the specific public health issue. To assess the overall performance of an intervention, health departments often both population-level outcomes and the mediating processes in between. These middle processes may include evaluation of patient interviews and contact tracing for infectious diseases.

Defining and measuring success in global health is a complex and contentious issue. Some frameworks define success in terms of disease control or the eradication of disease. However, the presence of various actors can complicate objective evaluation. Historically, certain funders and policymakers have selectively invoked historical episodes to push particular agendas about misperceived success. Although there is increasing awareness about the methodological challenges in producing evidence-based global health assessments, critiques of global health interventions remain politically sensitive due to the imperative for global health action, donor influence, and the potential for backlash.

== See also ==
- WASH (water, sanitation, hygiene)
