= Lot quality assurance sampling =

Lot quality assurance sampling (LQAS) is a random sampling methodology, originally developed in the 1920s as a method of quality control in industrial production. Compared to similar sampling techniques like stratified and cluster sampling, LQAS provides less information but often requires substantially smaller sample sizes.

== Summary ==
LQAS, sometimes called "acceptance sampling", involves taking a small random sample from each set of items in the population, and testing each sampled item to determine whether it meets a predetermined standard of quality. LQAS is functionally identical to stratified sampling (where each lot is a single stratum), but requires smaller samples because it does not attempt to construct a precise estimate of population parameters. Instead, after sampling, a researcher using LQAS performs a hypothesis test to determine whether the number of elements of interest in each lot (e.g. defective units in manufacturing, or persons with a particular medical condition in epidemiology) is likely to be greater than a predetermined threshold.

== Use ==
LQAS was originally designed for use in manufacturing, where it provided a way to perform statistically valid quality-assurance testing at minimum cost. In the context of modern research, LQAS has become an accepted sampling method in the fields of public health and international development. For example, in 1996 the World Health Organization issued a document describing LQAS, and recommended it for use in surveys to determine the number of children immunized against disease.
