= Health action process approach =

Theory of health behavior change

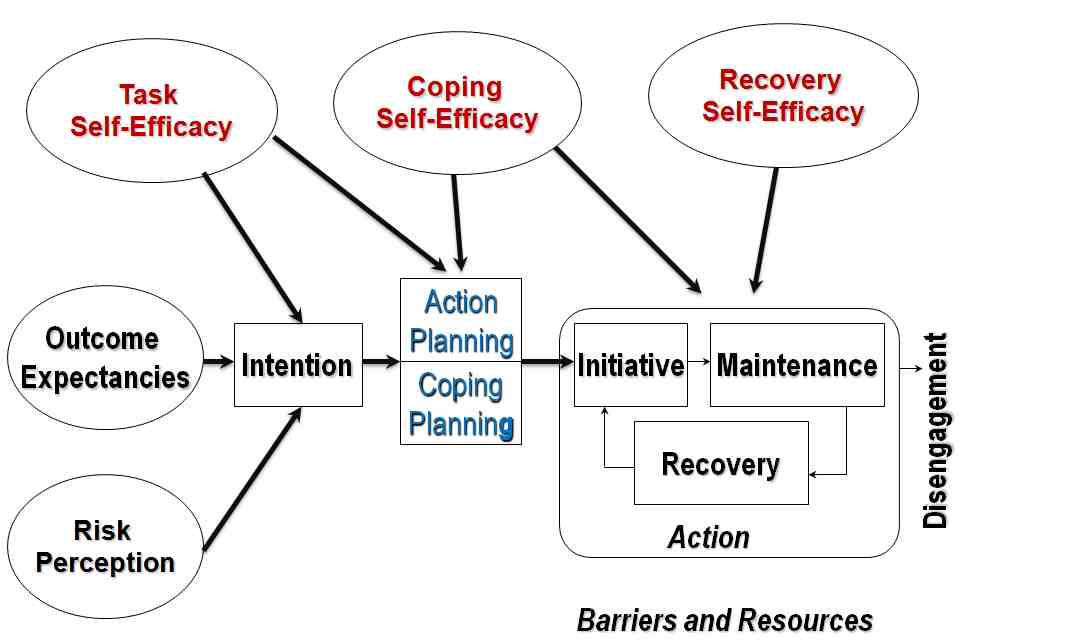
Health action process approach

The health action process approach (HAPA) is a psychological theory of health behavior change, developed by Ralf Schwarzer, Professor of Psychology at the Freie University Berlin of Berlin, Germany and SWPS University of Social Sciences and Humanities, Wroclaw, Poland, first published in 1992.

Health behavior change refers to a replacement of health-compromising behaviors (such as sedentary behavior) by health-enhancing behaviors (such as physical exercise). To describe, predict, and explain such processes, theories or models are being developed. Health behavioural change theories are designed to examine a set of psychological constructs that jointly aim at explaining what motivates people to change and how they take preventive action.

HAPA is an open framework of various motivational and volitional constructs that are assumed to explain and predict individual changes in health behaviors such as quitting smoking or drinking, and improving physical activity levels, dental hygiene, seat belt use, breast self-examination, dietary behaviors, and avoiding drunk driving. HAPA suggests that the adoption, initiation, and maintenance of health behaviors should be conceived of as a structured process including a motivation phase and a volition phase. The former describes the intention formation while the latter refers to planning, and action (initiative, maintenance, recovery). The model emphasizes the particular role of perceived self-efficacy at different stages of health behavior change.

== Background ==
Models that describe health behavior change can be distinguished in terms of the assumption whether they are continuum-based or stage-based. A continuum (mediator) model claims that change is a continuous process that leads from lack of motivation via action readiness either to successful change or final disengagement. Research on such mediator models are reflected by path diagrams that include distal and proximal predictors of the target behavior. On the other hand, the stage approach assumes that change is non-linear and consists of several qualitative steps that reflect different mindsets of people. A two-layer framework that can be applied either as a continuum or as a stage model is HAPA. It includes self-efficacy, outcome expectancies, and risk perception as distal predictors, intention as a middle-level mediator, and volitional factors (such as action planning) as the most proximal predictors of behavior. (See Self-efficacy.)

Good intentions are more likely to be translated into action when people plan when, where, and how to perform the desired behavior. Intentions foster planning, which in turn facilitates behavior change. Planning was found to mediate the intention-behavior relation. A distinction has been made between action planning and coping planning. Coping planning takes place when people imagine scenarios that hinder them to perform their intended behavior, and they develop one or more plans to cope with such a challenging situation.

HAPA is designed as a sequence of two continuous self-regulatory processes, a goal-setting phase (motivation) and a goal-pursuit phase (volition). The second phase is subdivided into a pre-action phase and an action phase. Thus, one can superimpose these three phases (stages) on the continuum (mediator) model as a second layer, and regard the stages as moderators. This two-layer architecture allows to switch between the continuum model and the stage model, depending on the given research question.

== Five principles ==
HAPA has five major principles that make it distinct from other models.

Principle 1: Motivation and volition. The first principle suggests that one should divide the health behavior change process into two phases. There is a switch of mindsets when people move from deliberation to action. First comes the motivation phase in which people develop their intentions. Afterwards, they enter the volition phase.

Principle 2: Two volitional phases. In the volition phase there are two groups of individuals: those who have not yet translated their intentions into action, and those who have. There are inactive as well as active persons in this phase. In other words, in the volitional phase one finds intenders as well as actors who are characterized by different psychological states. Thus, in addition to health behavior change as a continuous process, one can also create three categories of people with different mindsets depending on their current point of residence within the course of health behavior change: preintenders, intenders, and actors. The assessment of stages is done by behavior-specific stage algorithms.

Principle 3: Postintentional planning. Intenders who are in the volitional preactional stage are motivated to change, but do not act because they might lack the right skills to translate their intention into action. Planning is a key strategy at this point. Planning serves as an operative mediator between intentions and behavior.

Principle 4: Two kinds of mental simulation. Planning can be divided into action planning and coping planning. Action planning pertains to the when, where, and how of intended action. Coping planning includes the anticipation of barriers and the design of alternative actions that help to attain one's goals in spite of the impediments. The separation of the planning construct into two constructs, action planning and coping planning, has been found useful as studies have confirmed the discriminant validity of such a distinction. Action planning seems to be more important for the initiation of health behaviors, whereas coping planning is required for the initiation and maintenance of actions as well.

Principle 5: Phase-specific self-efficacy. Perceived self-efficacy is required throughout the entire process. However, the nature of self-efficacy differs from phase to phase. This difference relates to the fact that there are different challenges as people progress from one phase to the next one. Goal setting, planning, initiation, action, and maintenance pose challenges that are not of the same nature. Therefore, one should distinguish between preactional self-efficacy, coping self-efficacy, and recovery self-efficacy. Sometimes the terms task self-efficacy instead of preaction self-efficacy, and maintenance self-efficacy instead of coping and recovery self-efficacy are preferred.

== Psychological interventions ==
When it comes to the design of interventions, one can consider identifying individuals who reside either at the motivational stage or the volitional stage. Then, each group becomes the target of a specific treatment that is tailored to this group. Moreover, it is theoretically meaningful and has been found useful to subdivide further the volitional group into those who perform and those who only intend to perform. In the postintentional preactional stage, individuals are labeled "intenders", whereas in the actional stage they are labeled "actors". Thus, a suitable subdivision within the health behavior change process yields three groups: nonintenders, intenders, and actors. The term "stage" in this context was chosen to allude to the stage theories, but not in the strict definition that includes irreversibility and invariance. The terms "phase" or "mindset" may be equally suitable for this distinction. The basic idea is that individuals pass through different mindsets on their way to behavior change. Thus, interventions may be most efficient when tailored to these particular mindsets. For example, nonintenders are supposed to benefit from confrontation with outcome expectancies and some level of risk communication. They need to learn that the new behavior (e.g., becoming physically active) has positive outcomes (e.g., well-being, weight loss, fun) as opposed to the negative outcomes that accompany the current (sedentary) behavior (such as developing an illness or being unattractive). In contrast, intenders should not benefit from such a treatment because, after setting a goal, they have already moved beyond this mindset. Rather, they should benefit from planning to translate their intentions into action. Finally, actors do not need any treatment at all unless one wants to improve their relapse prevention skills. Then, they should be prepared for particular high-risk situations in which lapses are imminent. Preparation can be exercised by teaching them to anticipate such situations and by acquiring the necessary levels of perceived recovery self-efficacy. There are quite a few randomized controlled trials that have examined the notion of stage-matched interventions based on HAPA, for example in the context of dietary behaviors, physical activity, and dental hygiene.

== See also ==
- Behavioural change theories
