= Fear appeal =

Motivation and marketing device employing fear

Fear appeal is a term used in psychology, sociology and marketing. It generally describes a strategy for motivating people to take a particular action, endorse a particular policy, or buy a particular product, by arousing fear. A well-known example in television advertising was a commercial employing the musical jingle: "Never pick up a stranger, pick up Prestone anti-freeze." This was accompanied by images of shadowy strangers (hitchhikers) who would presumably do one harm if picked up. The commercial's main appeal was not to the positive features of Prestone anti-freeze, but to the fear of what a "strange" brand might do.

A fear appeal is a persuasive message that attempts to arouse fear in order to divert behavior through the threat of impending danger or harm. It presents a risk, presents the vulnerability to the risk, and then may, or may not suggest a form of protective action.

It is assumed that through a fear appeal the perception of threatening stimuli creates fear arousal. The state of fear is believed to be an unpleasant emotional state that involves physiological arousal that motivates cognitive, affective, and behavioral responses directed towards alleviating the threat or reducing fear. There are many different theoretical models of fear appeal messages. They include: the extended parallel process model, the drive theory, the subjective expected utility theory, the protection motivation theory, the health belief model, the theory of reasoned action, and the transtheoretical model. These models are widely used in substance abuse campaigns, sexual health programs, and many other general health contexts. The persuasive effect of fear appeals is thought to be influenced by several factors such as individual characteristics, self-efficacy, perception of norms, fear strength, perceived threat, perception of treatment efficacy, and defense mechanisms. Mixed results have been produced from studies that attempt to demonstrate the effectiveness of fear appeals for behavior modification, and a recent meta-analysis recommended caution in the use of fear appeals.

== Models ==
Over the last half century, a substantial amount of research has been done on the influence of fear on persuasion. A multitude of theories and models of fear appeals, also known as cognitive mediating processes, have been derived from this research. The goal of each of these has been to conceptualize the influence of fear on persuasion so as to better understand how to employ it in addressing the public on a number of social issues.

=== Extended parallel process model ===
The extended parallel process model (EPPM) is a theory that explains how cognitive and emotional mechanisms trigger distinct motivational and coping responses such as fear control and danger control responses. Fear control responses minimize fear through emotional coping that generates reassurance through denial of the threat or derogation of the persuasive message. Fear control is a process of denial that does not involve physically averting behavior to the perceived threat. Danger control is a cognitive process also oriented towards reducing the presented threat. However, unlike fear control response, danger control response may prompt protective action. Thus according to the extended parallel process model, the experience of fear is considered an emotional reaction, and the perceptions of threat are a set of cognitions. The extended parallel process model differs from many other fear appeal arguments because it suggests that fear arousal and danger control processes are distinct processes where fear arousal need not precede the danger control process that underpin precautionary behaviors.

It is predicted that a fear appeal will initiate a dominant response of either fear control or danger control processes. The extended parallel process model concludes that cognitions (attitudes, intentions, and behavior changes) result in fear appeal success via the danger control process. It also concludes that fear appeals fail when the fear emotion is reduced via the fear control process.

Defensive avoidance is an example of a fear control response that leads to the failure of fear appeals.

=== Drive theory ===
Emotional tension is a key characteristic of drive theory. According to the theory, a threat that portrays the negative consequences of non-compliance to a recommended behavior is expected to create fear. In order to relieve the emotional tension of the threat, the "drive" state motivates behavior conduct that reduces the tension. According to the drive theory, it is expected that the greater the fear, the greater the compliance to message recommendations.

Research has not produced consistent empirical results supporting the drive reduction model. For example, a dental hygiene presentation to a group of high school students reported greater change in attitudes using mild rather than strong fear appeals. When repeated, the reverse effect was true: greater attitude and behavior change occurred when a strong fear appeal was used, versus a moderate or weak fear appeal.

=== Subjective expected utility theory ===
The subjective expected utility theory has been applied to contexts beyond fear appeals. In the context of a fear appeal, the subjective expected utility theory predicts that a fear appeal is successful when the individual believes that the benefits in risk reduction outweigh the expected cost of acting. To assess the efficacy of a fear appeal respondents would be asked about the likelihood and severity of harmful outcomes of risk involved. The proposed severity is considered under the conditions of the current behavior and then under the alternative behavior. The efficacy is perceived through the effectiveness of the respondents answer. The subjective expected utility theory is unlike other theories of fear appeal because it does not describe the emotional process involved in fear reduction. It is only used to predict the relative likelihood of action. As previously stated, the subjective expected utility theory can be applied to various contexts such as predicting retirement and child-bearing.

=== Protection motivation theory ===
The protection motivation theory is an attitude-based model. It holds that a fear appeal argument initiates a cognitive assessment process that considers the severity of the threatened event, the probability of the occurrence of the event, and the efficacy of a recommended behavior response. According to the theory, the cognitive assessment processes enhance a fear appeal when it provokes protection motivation. Protection motivation is a variable that arouses, sustains, and directs the suggested behavior to avoid danger. In absence of protection motivation, the recommended protective action is judged to be ineffective in averting the threat or impossible to undertake then no intention to act will result. The protection motivation theory predicts that preventive actions will be preferred in a high threat situation when the self-efficacy and the efficacy of the recommended action are both high. Conversely, it is expected that maladaptive actions will be maintained when there is a high threat but the efficacy perceptions are low.

The protection motivation theory has been applied to analyzing the efficacy of health campaigns such as those encouraging self-breast examinations for detecting breast cancer. Studies found that perceptions of threat concerning breast cancer prompted adaptive actions, such as performing self-examinations, and maladaptive actions, such as to avoid thinking about breast cancer.

=== Health belief model ===
The health belief model predicts that perceived susceptibility and severity of a risk motivates individuals to engage in preventive actions, and the type of preventive action depends on the perceived benefits and hindrances of performing the action.

A fear argument based on the health belief model is typically presented in terms of the likelihood and severity of health consequences if the current behavior is not changed. With the health belief model, it is unclear whether self-efficacy is directly considered a cost of performing a suggested action because occasionally, a fear appeal is thought to be less effective if a difficulty of acting is considered a cost of acting.

=== Theory of reasoned action ===
According to the theory of reasoned action, acting on fear appeals begins by consideration of a wider range of consequences of continuing the current behavior beyond the threat of health risks. It also considers a wider range of consequences of the suggested behavior beyond the costs and reduced health risks. The projected consequences vary depending on the situation. The theory of reasoned action differs from other theories because it also incorporates a social influence factor in predicting the efficacy of fear appeals. The social influence is determined by normative beliefs and the desires of other relevant people to perform the given behavior.

The theory of reasoned action has been applied to alcohol, tobacco, and other drug campaigns. For example, it has helped identify the importance of peer pressure and the normative belief of parents as variables for improving school-based drug campaigns. Although the theory of reasoned action has been shown to be a strong predictive utility of social behavior, it is considered to be deficient in explaining behavior change.

=== Transtheoretical model ===
A transtheoretical model of fear appeals explains a dynamic process of health behavior change. Its structure is based on the assumption that behavior change is a systematic process involving a series of stages referred to as stages of change. It also holds that the transition between stages involves a rational coping process referred to as processes of change. The stages of change are: pre-contemplation, contemplation, preparation, action, and maintenance. According to the transtheoretical model, movement through the different stages involves a process called decision balance. Decision balance takes into account the potential gains and costs resulting from the new behavior. It is believed that an individual will not change or continue a behavior unless they perceive advantages to outweigh the disadvantages.

==== Pre-contemplation ====
The pre-contemplation stage is a period in which individuals have no intentions to stop a risky behavior or start a healthy behavior. This may be due to a lack in knowledge of the risk involving their current behavior, or an unwillingness to acknowledge that their behavior puts them at risk. The process of change from the pre-contemplation phase to the contemplation phase includes the response of conscious raising, dramatic relief, and an environmental reevaluation process to the argument.

==== Contemplation ====
The second stage is contemplation. It is the stage at which an individual is actively considering stopping risky behavior or starting a healthy behavior. It is predicted that individuals will remain at this stage for a long period of time due to the difficulty in evaluating the advantages and disadvantages of behavior change. The process of change to the following stage is expedited by self-reevaluation.

==== Preparation ====
This is the third stage at which individuals have been persuaded and commit to change their behavior. The process of change to the action stage involves a self-liberation process in which the fear appeal influences a changed behavior.

==== Action ====
Action is the stage at which the individual engages in behavior change. They have tried to stop their risky behavior. The process of change that helps facilitate progression includes behavioral processes, such as reinforcement management, helping relationships, counterconditioning, and stimulus control.

==== Maintenance ====
Maintenance is the final stage for changing risky behavior. This is the stage at which individuals adopt healthy behavior into their lifestyle, and try to prevent regression into the risk behavior. Regression is possible at any point of the stages.

The transtheoretical model has been used to structure various programs for smoking cessation, alcohol abstinence, sunscreen use, dietary change, and contraceptive use.

== Factors that affect its efficacy ==
"The ultimate goal of fear appeals is to effectively promote reflective message processing and to influence individual affect towards the message". Individual perceptual differences towards the fear appeal are factors that govern the efficacy of the fear appeal. Researchers have examined several variables that have been thought, at one time or another, to influence the persuasive effect of fear appeals. These factors include: individual characteristics, risk perception, perception of self-efficacy, perception of treatment efficacy, perception of norms, the strength of the fear elicited, perceived threat, and defense mechanisms. The results of the research have demonstrated that various, and sometimes multiple factors, affect the efficacy of fear appeals depending on the method used and the individual.

=== Individual characteristics ===
Also of interest in the fear appeals literature has been the contribution of individual characteristics. The goal has been to understand which individual differences in personality or psychological traits contribute or detract from the effectiveness of the fear appeal. Individual moderating variables studied thus far include trait anxiety, age, ethnicity, gender, coping style, locus of control, self-esteem, perceived vulnerability, need for cognition and uncertainty orientation. Of these, uncertainty orientation and need for cognition have been found to interact with the level of threat. Uncertainty orientation is an individual's characteristic response to uncertainty. That is, whether one attends to or avoids and ignores the source of the uncertainty. Those with an uncertainty orientation tend to be more motivated to deeply process the information presented as the personal relevance increases, whereas those with a certainty orientation will actively avoid it. Some early studies examined other characteristics, such as individual thresholds for fear arousal, to see if they moderated the effect of fear on persuasion. A study by Janis and Feshbach (1954) found that those with lower fear arousal thresholds were the least compelled to act by the high fear appeals, as they tended to react with defensive control responses. Lower threshold subjects were also more easily persuaded by counterarguments following the fear appeal. Trait anxiety has also been the subject of some of the early research, which has since been found to have no discernible effect on persuasion.

=== Perception of self-efficacy ===
The self-efficacy theory states that all processes of psychological change alter the level and strength of self-efficacy. Self-efficacy is enhanced by performance accomplishments, vicarious experience, verbal persuasion, and physiological states. Self-efficacy can also be enhanced by the perceived dependability of the source. The level of self-efficacy an individual has is believed to influence their choice of behavior as well as the amount of time, and the amount of effort expended on that behavior. If the individual does not believe that he or she is capable of averting the threat, it is likely that denial or other defensive responses will be produced in order to lower the fear. The fear of threatening situations may have an adverse effect on the efficacy of a fear appeal. An intimidating situation may cause an individual to believe that he/she is incapable of performing the suggested preventive behaviors that will lead to avoidance behaviors. Bandura's research has demonstrated a positive correlation between changes in behavior and changes in self-efficacy expectancy. He found that behavioral transformations are caused by changes in self-efficacy.

Research done by others have revealed "a positive, linear effect of fear on overall intentions and behavior", especially when the messages endorse people's self-efficacy. This effect is more positive when behaviors are performed on one-time basis instead of repeatedly. However, other researchers also pointed out that in the context of self-efficacy need to be considered carefully in relation to other strategies. The use of other persuasive techniques such as behavioral training might counteract against the efficacy of fear appeal in isolation.

==== Performance accomplishments ====
According to the theory of self-efficacy, performance accomplishments are related to the success of personal experience. When strong efficacy expectations are established, then the impact of occasional failures are reduced. If self-efficacy is established, it tends to generalize to other situations. Vicarious experience is the observation of others who have performed threatening activities. If others are observed to successfully perform threatening activities, then self-efficacy is expected to increase because the social comparison will reinforce the perception that the behavior can be achieved through effort.

==== Verbal persuasion ====
Verbal persuasion is widely used because of the potentially persuasive influence of suggestion. The influence of suggestion is expected to boost individual self-efficacy. Research has shown that the effects of verbal persuasion may not prevail through a long history of failure. It has been shown to create an enduring sense of self-efficacy in situations where aid is given to facilitate successful action. Failures have a negative effect because it discredits the persuaders and undermines the individual's self-efficacy.

==== Emotional arousal ====
Depending on the circumstances, stressful situations can lessen the feeling of personal competency. Poor performance, for example is usually associated with a state of high arousal. Fear-provoking thoughts can cause an individual to overestimate the intensity of a threatening situation. According to the self-efficacy theory, diminishing emotional arousal can reduce avoidance behavior.

==== Physiological arousal ====
Physiological arousal has been predicted to have both positive and negative effects on beneficial or negative coping behaviors. A positive perception of an aroused state may energize, while a negative perception of an aroused state may inhibit coping behaviors.

=== Perception of treatment efficacy ===
Perceived treatment efficacy is also referred to as response-outcome expectancies. It is conceptualized as a person's estimate that a given behavior will lead to certain outcomes. Perception of treatment efficacy differs from self-efficacy because an individual's belief in their ability to perform the suggested actions does not influence their behavior it is the perceived outcome that determines an individual's actions. The enactment of sustained long-term behaviors intended by the fear appeal communication is strongly influenced by the individual perception of treatment efficacy. The extent to which an individual perceives the protection of the recommended action against the health risk determines whether they are persuaded to perform the recommended course of action. A positive perception of treatment efficacy is internalized by the emphasis of the positive aspects of the recommended action. Perceived treatment efficacy is possibly the most integral element of an effectively persuasive fear appeal, and more predictive of action than fear arousal, is perceived efficacy. Some research has found that perceived efficacy is more predictive of intention to change behavior than other elements of perceived threat.

=== Perception of norms ===
Even if a health behavior is portrayed as harmful, the behavior may not be altered by fear inducing communication if the individual is convinced that the behavior is common practice. The behavior is unlikely to be changed if the individual's social group models or reinforces the actions. In this case, there may also be a false perception of norms. Reinforcement of the negative health behavior by the common social group decreases the effectiveness of the fear appeal.

Example: In a study of alcohol abuse on college campuses, students demonstrated heavy alcohol use in response to their peer groups that reinforced the behavior. Students who abused alcohol also believed that their peers were even heavier users than they actually were. Those who believed that heavy intoxication was an element of campus culture may be at a greater risk for personal alcohol abuse due to the desire to conform to the perceived norm.

=== Fear strength ===
The strength of the fear elicited by the message is also an important determinant of the subject's intentions to change the target behavior. Fear strength is distinct from threat severity in that, as mentioned before, fear strength is related to the emotion of fear, whereas threat severity is considered to be an entirely cognitive process. Some early research found that higher levels of fear produced defensive reactions, compelling the researchers to caution that low or moderate levels were the most effective. With rare exception, strength of the fear elicited has been consistently found to be positively correlated with behavior change. This positive linear correlation is ubiquitous in fear appeal research and has laid to rest the curvilinear relationship implied by some of the earliest research. Strength of fear has been found to be positively correlated, as expected, with arousal. Early research has found that low fear appeal strength was the most persuasive. Strength of fear alone is not enough to motivate change in behavior as strong fear with no recommended action, or a recommended action that is not easily performed, may result in the exact opposite effect. According to Sternthal and Craig, fear strength affects attitude change more than it does intentions. They argue that although persuasion increases when fear rises from low to moderate levels, when rising from moderate to high levels, it actually decreases.

Some have even gone so far as to argue that fear is an entirely unnecessary component of an effective appeal as perceived efficacy is more predictive of intention to change behavior than either element of perceived threat. The tendency for higher levels of fear to raise defensive control responses, it is argued, suggests that fear is not useful and that efficacy may be able to bring about intention and behavior change by itself. Another argument states that since higher levels of personal efficacy are necessary, the target of the fear appeal who is most likely to act is one who is most likely to change his behavior to begin with. The implication is that another tact (other than fear) is necessary.

=== Perceived threat ===
Perceived threat is thought to be an important moderator in the process of fear evoked persuasion. It consists of both the perceived severity of the threat and the perceived susceptibility to it.

Perceived susceptibility, sometimes referred to as perceived vulnerability, is thought to be key in motivating an individual to act in response to a fear appeal. It is the perception of the probability and extent to which he/she might experience the threat. Perceived severity, however, is the degree to which the person believes that they will be harmed if the threat is experienced. These threat components form the perceptual trigger for the fear reaction. Higher levels of perceived susceptibility have been found to increase the degree to which people are critical of the message. An example of a fear appeal of a message that emphasizes perceived severity would be the quote "AIDS leads to death". These threat components form the perceptual trigger for fear reaction. Higher levels of perceived susceptibility have been found to increase the degree to which people are critical of the message. However, subjects report more positive thoughts about the recommendation and negative emotions associated with the threat when susceptibility is high. Higher levels of perceived susceptibility are associated with greater intention to change behavior in the manner recommended in the fear appeal message, and are a strong determinant of intentions and behavior, even in the face of weak arguments. It is thought that when perceived susceptibility is high, defense motivations prevent even poor information or weak arguments from detracting from the message's impact on intention. As influential as it appears to be, susceptibility has still been found in some cases to have a much less direct effect on motivation to act on the message than, for instance, self efficacy beliefs or response efficacy.

Perceived severity, the extent to which the individual believes he/she will be adversely affected by the threat has a significant effect on persuasion. A statement that emphasizes the seriousness of a threat would be a statement directed towards a targeted population. An example would be, "You're at-risk for AIDS because you share needles while using intravenous drugs". In some cases, persuasion has been found to be aided by lowering severity, the majority of the fear appeal research has found just the opposite. However, it is important to distinguish perceived severity of the threat from the actual fear elicited. The former is considered to be an entirely cognitive process, while the latter is an emotional process. Some have even argued that cognitive processes in the context of fear appeals are more important than emotional ones. Research has found that the effect of fear on intentions is mediated by the perceived severity. That is, fear does not act directly on intentions, but increases the level of perceived severity, which in turn raises intentions to act on the message. Indeed, the strength of the fear appeal is believed to be positively correlated with the perceived severity of the threat. Severity seems to produce the strongest effects on perceptions.

=== Fear Appeal in Politics ===
Fear appeal is a subject studied within political science. Fear surveys indicate that, in specific contexts, messages from pro-authoritarian actors in the media are perceived with fear. Consequently, systems of oppression rely on the cultivation of fear appeals. For instance, the specific case of Belarus illustrates how communication strategies, the institutional framework, and repressive means are closely related and intertwined. At the same time, survey results show that respondents are indeed affected by these fear appeals.

=== Defense mechanisms ===
The previous components are thought to determine what response an individual has to the message. One of these potential reactions to the fear appeal that is of the most negative consequence is that of the defensive fear control reaction. In response to the fear appeal, an individual may form the intent to change their behavior. However, when either self or response efficacy is low, the individual, perceiving that they are unable to avert the threat, may rely on defensive avoidance to lower their fear. Some have argued that fear appeals are unnecessary as defensive avoidance reactions have been found in some studies to be positively correlated with strength of fear and negatively with perceived efficacy. The required balance of fear and efficacy levels has been the subject of much research, with some finding that moderate to high levels of fear are unnecessary in changing intentions. In fact, they argue, what is important is the ratio of these to each other. Gore and Bracken (2005) found that even with low levels of threat, they were able to take individuals who had started to exhibit defensive fear control reactions to move toward danger control (intention change) reactions. Another way of defending yourself against fear appeals is prior knowledge, according to one study, individuals are less likely to be influenced by a fear appeal if they have prior knowledge.

== Examples ==
- Scared Straight!
- "This is your brain on drugs"
- Videos of accidents caused by texting and driving
- Seatbelt campaigns

== Objections to scientific validity ==
It is evident that anxiety responses may not be helpful when elicited in the target group. This is because, while anxiety can motivate positive health behaviour, it can also be maladaptive, as some individuals form a defensive response to mitigate the negative feeling arising from the fear appeal. While there have been mixed results regarding whether fear appeals elicit a defense response, studies exploring this relationship are done in a laboratory setting free of external distractions and where participants are told to focus on the health messages. It may be that people may have stronger defense responses in real life situations where they must navigate a complex range of competing messages and where they have the option of ignoring the message or looking for competing explanations. In addition to this, no studies have followed responses to fear appeals over the longer term, and it possible that repetition of fear appeals may lead to habituation and annoyance, therefore cause individuals to tune out to the messages of the health promotion campaign.

== Objections to ethical validity ==
A number of ethical concerns regarding the use of fear appeals have been raised, leading to widespread debate regarding the acceptability of their use. For example, it has been questioned whether it is ethical to expose large numbers of people to potentially distressing messages without their consent. Hastings, Stead and Webb question whether it is ethically acceptable to expose an entire population to a distressing message intended for a specific subset of that population. For example, a fear appeal message stressing the likelihood of premature death for individuals who smoke may also reach the children of people who smoke, leading to avoidable anxiety in such groups.

If fear appeals do work, some authors question whether it is ethical to frighten people in to behaving in a certain way, as this may compromise their autonomy by manipulating their beliefs.

A concern has also been raised that fear appeals serve to contribute to the widening of health disparities. This is because certain individuals are more likely to develop the maladaptive responses mentioned above. Empirical research suggests that fear appeals work best for individuals with high levels of self-efficacy, and that maladaptive responses are more likely in those with low self-efficacy. This means that fear appeals work best for those who are equipped, both physically and psychologically, to take appropriate action. Individuals who do not have the resources for health behaviour change are often those who already have negative health status. For example, people who regularly engage in behaviours which are damaging to health (e.g. smoking and other drug use) have been found to typically have lower self-efficacy than others. Therefore, it seems that, in addition to having the potential to cause harm, this harm is more likely to affect groups that would most benefit from health behaviour change, therefore contributing to the widen of health disparities.

There is also a concern that fear appeals give rise to stigmatisation of those who are seen to be already suffering the negative consequences of the undesirable behaviour. For example, injury prevention campaigns often rely on emphasising the negative consequences of potentially becoming disabled. Wang hypothesises that when becoming disabled is portrayed as unacceptable, so is being disabled, adding to the stigmatisation of disabled individuals. For example, in responses to a poster campaign stating that "Last year, 1057 teenagers got so drunk they couldn't stand up. Ever." presented alongside a picture of a wheelchair, disabled participants in Wang's study felt that this held them up as an example of how not to be. One participant said "I feel it's an attack on my self esteem and dignity."

== See also ==
- Appeal to fear
- Appeal to emotion
- Culture of fear
- Fear mongering
- Moral panic
