= Health belief model =

Psychological model for potentially detrimental attitudes and actions on their health

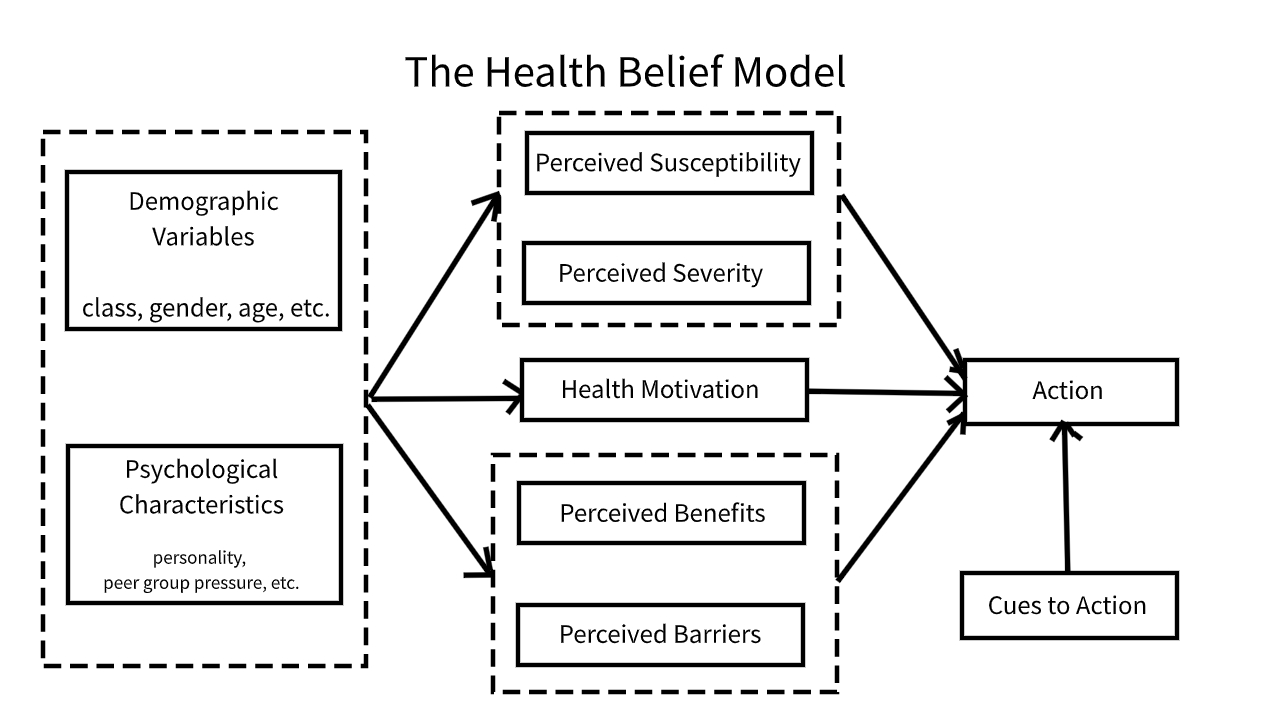
Original health belief model

In social psychology, the health belief model (HBM) is a psychological framework used to explain and predict individuals' potentially detrimental behaviors, attitudes and beliefs on their health. Developed in the 1950s by social psychologists at the United States Public Health Service, the model examines how perceptions of susceptibility to illness, the severity of health conditions, the benefits of preventive care, and barriers to healthcare influence behavior. The HBM is widely used in health behavior research and public health interventions to understand and promote engagement in health-protective behaviors. It also incorporates concepts similar to the transtheoretical model like self-efficacy, or confidence in one's ability to take action, and identifies the role of cues to action or stimulus, such as health campaigns or medical advice, in prompting behavior change.

== History ==
One of the first theories of health behavior, the HBM was developed in 1950s by social psychologists Irwin M. Rosenstock, Godfrey M. Hochbaum, S. Stephen Kegeles, and Howard Leventhal at the U.S. Public Health Service. At that time, researchers and health practitioners were worried because few people were getting screened for tuberculosis (TB), even if mobile X-ray cars went to neighborhoods. The HBM has been applied to predict a wide variety of health-related behaviors such as being screened for the early detection of asymptomatic diseases and receiving immunizations. More recently, the model has been applied to understand intentions to vaccinate (e.g. COVID-19), preventive measures to combat the spread of COVID-19 at a social gathering (such as getting tested or limiting the number of attendees) responses to symptoms of disease, compliance with medical regimens, lifestyle behaviors (e.g. sexual risk behaviors), and behaviors related to chronic illnesses, which may require long-term behavior maintenance in addition to initial behavior change. Amendments to the model were made as late as 1988 to incorporate emerging evidence within the field of psychology about the role of self-efficacy in decision-making and behavior.

== Theoretical constructs ==
The HBM theoretical constructs originate from theories in Cognitive Psychology. In early twentieth century, cognitive theorists believed that reinforcements operated by affecting expectations rather than bys affecting behavior straightly. Mental processes are severe consists of cognitive theories that are seen as expectancy-value models, because they propose that behavior is a function of the degree to which people value a result and their evaluation of the expectation, that a certain action will lead that result. In terms of the health-related behaviors, the value is avoiding sickness. The expectation is that a certain health action could prevents the condition for which people consider they might be at risk.

The following constructs of the HBM are proposed to vary between individuals and predict engagement in health-related behaviors.

=== Perceived susceptibility ===
Perceived susceptibility refers to subjective assessment of risk of developing a health problem. The HBM predicts that individuals who perceive that they are susceptible to a particular health problem will engage in behaviors to reduce their risk of developing the health problem. Individuals with low perceived susceptibility may deny that they are at risk for contracting a particular illness. Others may acknowledge the possibility that they could develop the illness, but believe it is unlikely.

The combination of perceived severity and perceived susceptibility is referred to as perceived threat. Perceived severity and perceived susceptibility to a given health condition depend on knowledge about the condition. The HBM predicts that higher perceived threat leads to a higher likelihood of engagement in health-promoting behaviors.

=== Perceived severity ===
Perceived severity refers to the subjective assessment of the severity of a health problem and its potential consequences. The HBM proposes that individuals who perceive a given health problem as serious are more likely to engage in behaviors to prevent the health problem from occurring (or reduce its severity). Perceived seriousness encompasses beliefs about the disease itself (e.g., whether it is life-threatening or may cause disability or pain) as well as broader impacts of the disease on functioning in work and social roles.

Through studying Australians and their self-reporting in 2019 of receiving the influenza vaccine, researchers found that by studying perceived severity they could determine the likelihood that Australians would receive the shot. They asked, "On a scale from 0 to 10, how severe do you think the flu would be if you got it?" to measure the perceived severity and they found that 31% perceived the severity of getting the flu as low, 44% as moderate, and 25% as high. Additionally, the researchers found those with a high perceived severity were significantly more likely to have received the vaccine than those with a moderate perceived severity. Furthermore, self-reported vaccination was similar for individuals with low and moderate perceived severity of influenza.

=== Perceived benefits ===
Health-related behaviors are also influenced by the perceived benefits of taking action. Perceived benefits refer to an individual's assessment of the value or efficacy of engaging in a health-promoting behavior to decrease risk of disease. If an individual believes that a particular action will reduce susceptibility to a health problem or decrease its seriousness, then he or she is likely to engage in that behavior regardless of objective facts regarding the effectiveness of the action.

=== Perceived barriers ===
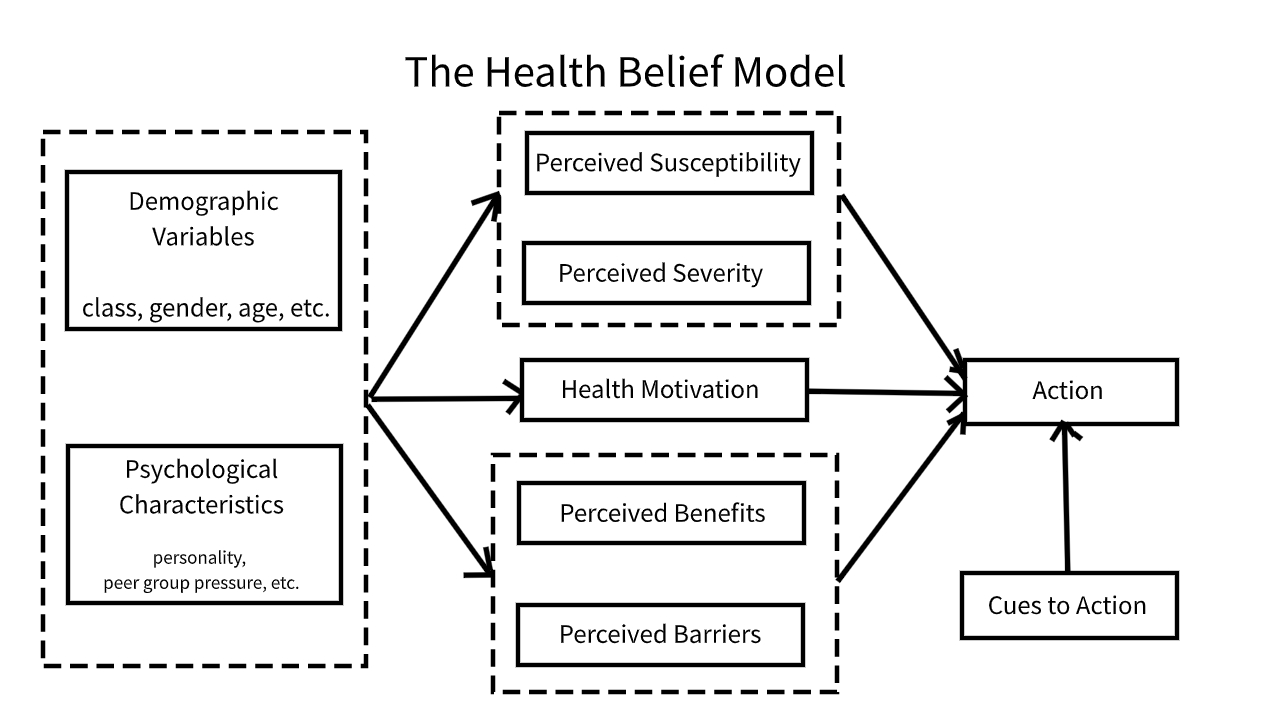

Health-related behaviors are also a function of perceived barriers to taking action. Perceived barriers refer to an individual's assessment of the obstacles to behavior change. Even if an individual perceives a health condition as threatening and believes that a particular action will effectively reduce the threat, barriers may prevent engagement in the health-promoting behavior. In other words, the perceived benefits must outweigh the perceived barriers in order for behavior change to occur. Perceived barriers to taking action include the perceived inconvenience, expense, danger (e.g., side effects of a medical procedure) and discomfort (e.g., pain, emotional upset) involved in engaging in the behavior. For instance, lack of access to affordable health care and the perception that a flu vaccine shot will cause significant pain may act as barriers to receiving the flu vaccine. In a study about the breast and cervical cancer screening among Hispanic women, perceived barriers, like fear of cancer, embarrassment, fatalistic views of cancer and language, was proved to impede screening.

=== Modifying variables ===
Individual characteristics, including demographic, psychosocial, and structural variables, can affect perceptions (i.e., perceived seriousness, susceptibility, benefits, and barriers) of health-related behaviors. Demographic variables include age, sex, race, ethnicity, and education, among others. Psychosocial variables include personality, social class, and peer and reference group pressure, among others. Structural variables include knowledge about a given disease and prior contact with the disease, among other factors. The HBM suggests that modifying variables affect health-related behaviors indirectly by affecting perceived seriousness, susceptibility, benefits, and barriers.

=== Cues to action ===
The HBM posits that a cue, or trigger, is necessary for prompting engagement in health-promoting behaviors. Cues to action can be internal or external. Physiological cues (e.g., pain, symptoms) are an example of internal cues to action. External cues include events or information from close others, the media, or health care providers promoting engagement in health-related behaviors. Examples of cues to action include a reminder postcard from a dentist, the illness of a friend or family member, mass media campaigns on health issues, and product health warning labels. The intensity of cues needed to prompt action varies between individuals by perceived susceptibility, seriousness, benefits, and barriers.

=== Self-efficacy ===
Self-efficacy was added to the four components of the HBM (i.e., perceived susceptibility, severity, benefits, and barriers) in 1988. Self-efficacy refers to an individual's perception of his or her competence to successfully perform a behavior. Self-efficacy was added to the HBM in an attempt to better explain individual differences in health behaviors. The model was originally developed in order to explain engagement in one-time health-related behaviors such as being screened for cancer or receiving an immunization. Eventually, the HBM was applied to more substantial, long-term behavior change such as diet modification, exercise, and smoking. Developers of the model recognized that confidence in one's ability to effect change in outcomes (i.e., self-efficacy) was a key component of health behavior change. For example, Schmiege et al. found that when dealing with calcium consumption and weight-bearing exercises, self-efficacy was a more powerful predictor than beliefs about future negative health outcomes.

Rosenstock et al. argued that self-efficacy could be added to the other HBM constructs without elaboration of the model's theoretical structure. However, this was considered short-sighted because related studies indicated that key HBM constructs have indirect effects on behavior as a result of their effect on perceived control and intention, which might be regarded as more proximal factors of action.

== Empirical support ==
The HBM has gained substantial empirical support since its development in the 1950s. It remains one of the most widely used and well-tested models for explaining and predicting health-related behavior. A 1984 review of 18 prospective and 28 retrospective studies suggests that the evidence for each component of the HBMl is strong. The review reports that empirical support for the HBM is particularly notable given the diverse populations, health conditions, and health-related behaviors examined and the various study designs and assessment strategies used to evaluate the model. A more recent meta-analysis found strong support for perceived benefits and perceived barriers predicting health-related behaviors, but weak evidence for the predictive power of perceived seriousness and perceived susceptibility. The authors of the meta-analysis suggest that examination of potential moderated and mediated relationships between components of the model is warranted.

Several studies have provided empirical support from the chronic illness perspective. Becker et al. used the model to predict and explain a mother's adherence to a diet prescribed for their obese children. Cerkoney et al. interviewed insulin-treated diabetic individuals after diabetic classes at a community hospital. It empirically tested the HBM's association with the compliance levels of persons chronically ill with diabetes mellitus.

== Applications ==
The HBM has been used to develop effective interventions to change health-related behaviors by targeting various aspects of the model's key constructs. Interventions based on the HBM may aim to increase perceived susceptibility to and perceived seriousness of a health condition by providing education about prevalence and incidence of disease, individualized estimates of risk, and information about the consequences of disease (e.g., medical, financial, and social consequences). Interventions may also aim to alter the cost-benefit analysis of engaging in a health-promoting behavior (i.e., increasing perceived benefits and decreasing perceived barriers) by providing information about the efficacy of various behaviors to reduce risk of disease, identifying common perceived barriers, providing incentives to engage in health-promoting behaviors, and engaging social support or other resources to encourage health-promoting behaviors. Furthermore, interventions based on the HBM may provide cues to action to remind and encourage individuals to engage in health-promoting behaviors. Interventions may also aim to boost self-efficacy by providing training in specific health-promoting behaviors, particularly for complex lifestyle changes (e.g., changing diet or physical activity, adhering to a complicated medication regimen). Interventions can be aimed at the individual level (i.e., working one-on-one with individuals to increase engagement in health-related behaviors) or the societal level (e.g., through legislation, changes to the physical environment, mass media campaigns).

The recent book chapter further emphasizes the need to interpret and apply the Health Belief Model through cultural and contextual lenses. It discusses how cultural values, community norms, and societal structures can shape individuals’ perceptions of health threats and their motivation to engage in preventive behaviors. Integrating these cultural dimensions into HBM-based interventions enhances their relevance and effectiveness, ensuring that behavior change strategies align with local beliefs and practices.

== Limitations ==
The HBM attempts to predict health-related behaviors by accounting for individual differences in beliefs and attitudes. However, it does not account for other factors that influence health behaviors. For instance, habitual health-related behaviors (e.g., smoking, seatbelt buckling) may become relatively independent of conscious health-related decision-making processes. Additionally, individuals engage in some health-related behaviors for reasons unrelated to health (e.g., exercising for aesthetic reasons). Environmental factors outside an individual's control may prevent engagement in desired behaviors. For example, an individual living in a dangerous neighborhood may be unable to go for a jog outdoors due to safety concerns. Furthermore, the HBM does not consider the impact of emotions on health-related behavior. Evidence suggests that fear may be a key factor in predicting health-related behavior.

Alternative factors may predict health behavior, such as outcome expectancy (i.e., whether the person feels they will be healthier as a result of their behavior) and self-efficacy (i.e., the person's belief in their ability to carry out preventive behavior).

The theoretical constructs that constitute the HBM are broadly defined. Furthermore, the HBM does not specify how constructs of the model interact with one another. Therefore, different operationalizations of the theoretical constructs may not be strictly comparable across studies.

Research assessing the contribution of cues to action in predicting health-related behaviors is limited. Cues to action are often difficult to assess, limiting research in this area. For instance, individuals may not accurately report cues that prompted behavior change. Cues such as a public service announcement on television or on a billboard may be fleeting and individuals may not be aware of their significance in prompting them to engage in a health-related behavior. Interpersonal influences are also particularly difficult to measure as cues.

Scholars extend the HBM by adding four more variables (self-identity, perceived importance, consideration of future consequences and concern for appearance) as possible determinants of healthy behavior. They prove that consideration of future consequences, self-identity, concern for appearance, perceived importance, self-efficacy, perceived susceptibility are significant determinants of healthy eating behavior that can be manipulated by healthy eating intervention design.

== See also ==
- United States Public Health Service
  - Centers for Disease Control and Prevention
  - National Institute for Occupational Safety and Health
