= Reasoned action approach =

Framework for the prediction of human social behavior

The reasoned action approach (RAA) is an integrative framework for the prediction (and change) of human social behavior. The reasoned action approach states that attitudes towards the behavior, perceived norms, and perceived behavioral control determine people's intentions, while people's intentions predict their behaviors.

== History ==
The reasoned action approach is the latest version of the theoretical ideas of Martin Fishbein and Icek Ajzen, following the earlier theory of reasoned action and the theory of planned behavior. Those theoretical ideas have resulted in over a thousand empirical studies in behavioral science journals. The RAA originally came from Jacquelynne Eccles' expectancy-value theory. Later Martin Fishbein and Icek Ajzen extended expectancy-value theory into the theory of reasoned action (TRA) by adding the element of intention. Then, they took the element of intention into account and created the theory of planned behavior. The RAA iteration brings together those earlier versions and provides a more comprehensive view.

== Model ==

Behavior is determined by the intention and moderated by actual control. Intention is determined by attitude, perceived norm, and perceived behavioral control. Perceived behavioral control influences behavior directly and indirectly through intention. Actual control feeds back to perceived control. Performing the behavior feeds back to the beliefs underlying the three determinants of intention. All possible influences on behavior that are not in the model are treated as background variables and are supposed to be mediated by the determinants in the model.

== Concepts ==
The reasoned action approach uses a number of concepts, each of which is briefly defined here:

=== Behaviors ===
Observable events composed of four elements: the action performed, the target at which the action is directed, the context in which it is performed, and the time at which it is performed.

=== Intentions ===
The person's estimate of the likelihood or perceived probability of performing a given behavior.

=== Perceived behavioral control ===
People's perceptions of the degree to which they are capable of, or have control over, performing a given behavior.

- Perceived capacity: The belief that one can, is able to, or is capable of, performing the behavior (comparable to Albert Bandura's concept of self-efficacy); autonomy: perceived degree of control over performing the behavior.
- Perceived autonomy: The perceived ability to perform the behavior and the extent to which the decision is under an individual's control.

=== Attitude ===
A latent disposition or tendency to respond with some degree of favorableness or unfavorableness to a psychological object.

- Instrumental aspect: Anticipated positive or negative consequences;
- Experiential aspect: Perceived positive or negative experiences.

=== Norm ===
Perceived social pressure to perform or not to perform a given behavior.

- Injunctive norm: Perceptions concerning what should or ought to be done;
- Descriptive norms: Perceptions that others are or are not performing the behavior in question.

== Measures ==
Concepts in the reasoned-action approach can be measured directly, and indirectly through the underlying beliefs.

=== Direct measures ===
These are a number of examples of the ways in which measurement items are constructed to measure the variables specified in the RAA.

- Behavior: (in terms of target, action, context, and time) i.e. "I (adolescent) always use condoms when having sex, at least during my teenage years", true – false.
- Intention: i.e. "I intend to [behavior]", likely – unlikely.
- Attitude: i.e. "My doing [behavior] would be" bad – good (instrumental), pleasant – unpleasant (experiential).
- Perceived norms: i.e. "Most people who are important to me think I should [behavior]", agree – disagree (injunctive); "most people like me do [behavior]", likely – unlikely (descriptive).
- Perceived behavioral control: i.e. "I am confident that I can do [behavior]", true – false (capacity); "my doing [behavior] is up to me", disagree – agree (autonomy).

=== Indirect measures ===
In their 2010 book, Fishbein and Ajzen provide detailed examples of indirect measures in the Appendix, pp. 449–463.

== Criticisms ==
=== Question of rationality ===
The reasoned action approach has been criticized for being too rational. Fishbein and Ajzen argue that to be a misunderstanding of the theory. There is nothing in their theory to suggest that people are rational; the theory only assumes that people have behavioral, normative and control beliefs which may be completely irrational but will determine behavior.

=== Reasoned versus automatic behavior ===
Another critical comment implies that most behavior is not intentional. Fishbein and Ajzen argue that beliefs and intention can be activated automatically. They also suggest that alternative concepts, such as willingness, are in fact measures of intentions. Implicit associations are often different from explicit attitude measures, but there is little evidence to suggest that they predict behavior more adequately.

=== Question of sufficient measurements ===
Sutton pointed out that the reasoned-action model still leaves much of the variance in behavior unexplained. Different measures of effect size might cause huge differences. Sutton listed nine reasons why the reasoned-action model has poor predicting power:

1. Intentions may change
2. Intentions may be provisional
3. Violation of the principle of compatibility
4. Violation of scale correspondence
5. Unequal number of response categories for intention and behavior
6. Random measurement error in the measures of intention, behavior or both
7. Restriction of range/Variance in intention or behavior
8. Marginal distributions of the measures do not match
9. Intention may not be the sufficient cause of behavior

A further criticism on the reasoned action approach concerns the sufficiency assumption, which suggests that the theory captures all relevant determinants of intention. Ajzen stated that the theory is open to the inclusion of additional predictors if it can be shown that they capture a significant proportion of the variance in intention or behavior after the theory's current variables have been taken into account. Several researchers have indeed offered possible extensions, for example self-identity, next to the three current variables claiming these contribute significant additional explained variance in intention and behavior. In the reasoned-action approach, Fishbein and Ajzen have indeed included new variables, but within the current three determinants (p. 282). They formulate strict criteria for a so-called 'fourth' variable and argue that none of the variables proposed fulfill these criteria.

=== Model cannot be tested ===
A majority of previous studies reported results that cannot support the expected associations between variables and predicted outcomes. However, because there are too many left out variables, and many other social cognition models might play parts in it, it is unclear whether the data can reject the model. Thus, this model cannot be tested.

However, Ajzen and Fishbein published a comment paper disputed Ogden's critiques.

=== Creating new cognitions ===
Ogden also mentioned that the use of questionnaire might create new cognitions or change existing cognitions rather than measuring existing cognitions. Thus, simply completing a questionnaire might also possible cause changes in participant's subsequent behaviors.

Ajzen and Fishbein also provide their explanation for this critique in their comment paper.

=== Culture ===
With respect to social-cognitive theories in general, authors have criticized the 'Western' character of theories and argued that theories are not culture-free. However, finding, in a specific cultural setting, specific beliefs that are not part of a general theory does not in itself invalidate the usefulness of the theory. Fishbein and Ajzen have repeatedly stressed the importance of an open elicitation procedure to identify all relevant underlying beliefs. The theory of reasoned action and the theory of planned behavior have successfully been applied in many different cultural settings.

=== Applying to changing behavior ===
In the reasoned-action approach change is seen as a planned process in three phases: elicitation of the relevant beliefs, changing intentions by changing salient beliefs, and changing behavior by changing intentions and increasing skills or decreasing environmental barriers. The basic idea behind selecting any potential change method is that the salient beliefs are to be changed. Fishbein and Ajzen recognize methods such as persuasive communication, use of arguments, framing, active participation, modeling, and group discussion, but indicate that these methods will only have effect when salient behavioral, normative, or control beliefs are changed. Obviously, it is important that the salient beliefs are identified and measured correctly. Witte suggests to first organize the results of the beliefs elicitation in a list of relevant categories (for example, behavioral beliefs, normative beliefs, self-efficacy beliefs, values) and then to decide which beliefs need to be changed, which need to be reinforced, and which need to be introduced.

== Applications ==
The reasoned action approach is applied in many different settings and with many different behaviors, such as: health-related behaviors, sustainable behaviors, traffic behaviors, organizational behaviors, political behaviors, and discriminatory behaviors.

=== Health behaviors ===
The reasoned action approach can be applied to predict both protection and risk health behaviors. Past behavior, instrumental attitude, experiential attitude, and descriptive norms are significant positive predictors of intentions for health risk behaviors. Injunctive norms are not significant intentions predictors, and autonomy is a negative predictor only when past behavior was not controlled.

==== Switching to e-cigarettes ====
Dobbs, Branscum, Cohn, Tackett, and Comiford studied what factors may have impacts on pregnant smoker's decision-making to switch from cigarettes to e-cigarettes during pregnancy using the RAA framework. The study reported that the intention to switch is positively related to the instrumental belief that switching was good and believing pregnant people are commonly switching to e-cigarettes. The decision to switch is also positively associated to whether this woman had used an e-cigarette in the past 30 days. However, others' perceived judgement might not have influence on the pregnant smoker's intention, showing that injunctive norms are not related to the decision-making.

==== Condom use ====
RAA can be applied to predict condom use among at-risk and HIV-seropositive person. For both insertive and receptive anal sex, attitudes and perceived behavioral control are related with use of condoms with a new partner. But perceived behavioral control were only significant direct associate to insertive anal intercourse with individual whose serostatus was unknown by his or her partner. Moreover, subjective norm is not significantly related with intention.

=== Partner behaviors ===
RAA can be applied to predict abusive relationship by looking at monitoring/controlling behaviors displayed in the early stage of the relationship. The study showed that normative beliefs of what their friends and parents support or perform have a significant impact on both boys and girls. Friends' norms are important predictors of adolescents' dating violence. Parents also play a vital role, especially with boys, in partner abusive behaviors. Attitudes and social norms are also good predictors.

=== Gambling behavior ===
Studies also show how RAA can be used to achieve a change of problem gambling behavior. In the article, Tom St Quinton not only indicated how gambling behavior can be reduced by using RAA, but also discussed how to maintain the new developed behaviors.

=== Work-to-nonwork integration behavior ===
Palm, Seubert, and Glaser analysed how motivated employees perform a work role in the nonwork domain, drawing on the RAA. The study examined four factors: individuals’ attitudes toward integration (integration preference), perceived employer expectations (injunctive norms), perceived integration behavior of coworkers (descriptive norms), and perceived control to manage the work–nonwork interface (behavioral control). The result showed that all four factors all can be served as predictors for work-to-nonwork interface.

== See also ==
- Behavioural change theories
- Theory of planned behavior
- Theory of reasoned action
- Expectancy-value theory
- Family planning
- Health promotion
- Social and behavior change communication
- Behavior change (public health)
- Behavior change method
- Lifestyle medicine
