= Attitude-behavior consistency =

Concept in social psychology

Attitude-behaviour consistency is a central concept in social psychology, referring to the relationship and alignment between an individual's beliefs, or attitudes, and their actions, or behaviour. Specifically, the concept attitude-behaviour consistency addresses the parts of the study of attitudes in which social psychologists examine whether people's actions can be understood as arising from their beliefs and opinions.

The relationship has been highly debated among researchers, given the fact that individuals often act in ways that seem inconsistent with their attitudes. Many argue that attitudes are not the only factors influencing behaviour; some people may behave more in line with their attitudes than others, and people's behaviour may align more with their attitudes in some circumstances than in others.

The consistency between attitudes and behaviours can be explained by moderating factors, which strengthen or weaken the relationship. Some of the categories of moderators include attitude strength and accessibility, individual factors, and situational/contextual factors.

== Attitudes-Behaviour Models ==
An attitude is a psychological construct ranging from positive to negative that reflects an individual's evaluation of an object, person or issue. These evaluations are shaped by affects, behaviours, and cognition. Affects are emotional responses, behaviours are intentions or tendencies to act and cognition includes beliefs about the object that is being evaluated (attitude object). These components interact to create a coherent, though not always consistent, attitude toward an object. Even in this regard there is still variability as the impact of each component can vary from person to person. While some attitudes are more influenced by emotions others may be more impacted by behaviours and beliefs. A meta analysis conducted by Stephan Kraus in 1995 found that attitudes influence behaviours when attitudes are stable, more accessible, and there is direct experience with the attitude object. Attitudes are more likely to predict behaviours when the attitude is strong and accessible, the influence of social influences is minimal and the attitude aligns with the specific behavior. However when there are external pressures or conflicting priorities attitudes may fail to predict behaviours.

=== Theory of Planned Behaviour ===
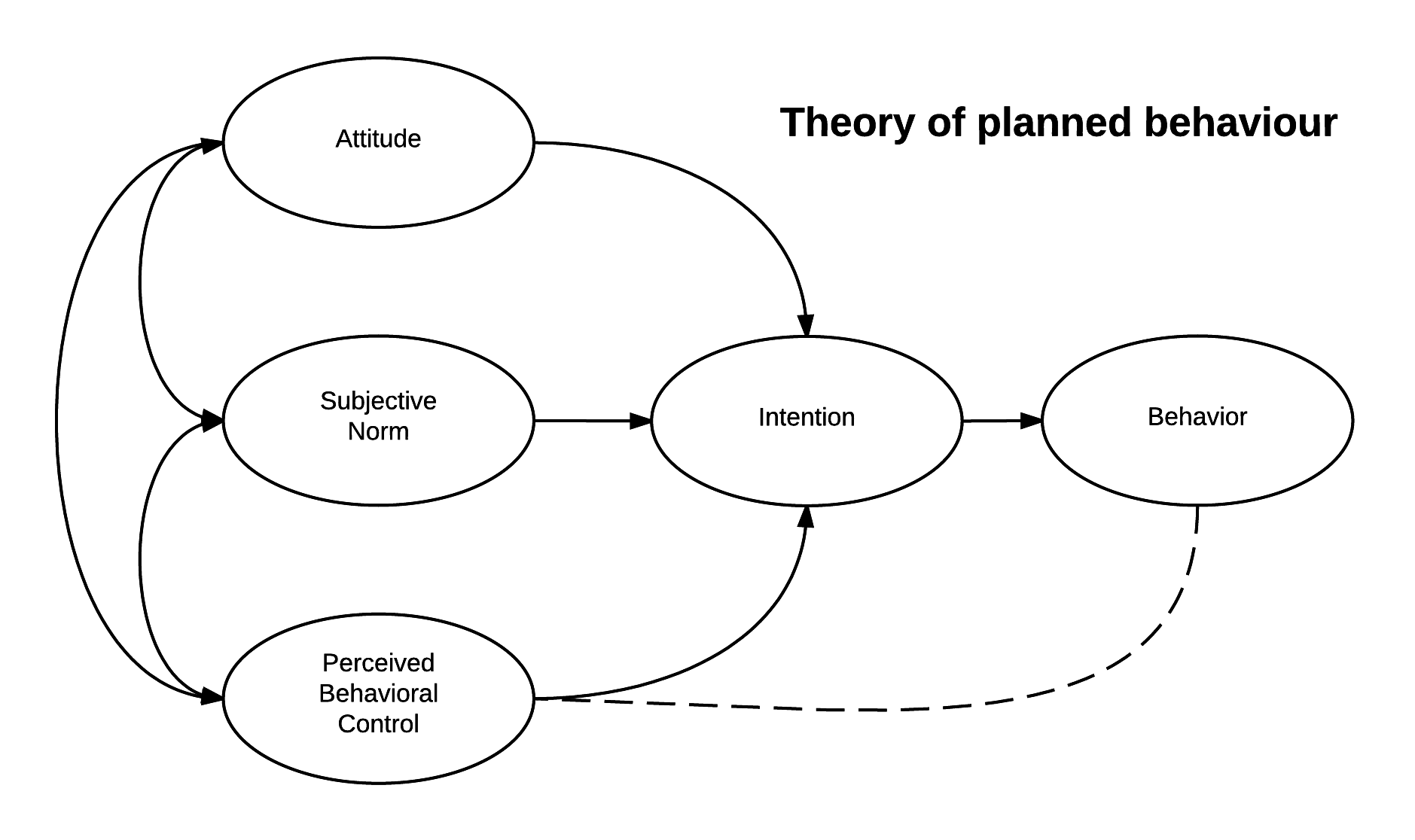
Theory of Planned Behavior

The theory of planned behaviour, developed by Martin Fishbein and Izek Ajzen, suggests that people act rationally and their behaviours are influenced by intentions. There are three key variables that jointly predict our intentions:

1. The attitude toward the behaviour
2. Subjective norms
3. Perceived behavioural control ( a person's belief in their ability to perform a behavior)

The likelihood of the intention to perform the behaviour and the behaviour itself increases as the three factors become more favourable.

== Consistency Theories ==
=== Balance Theory ===
Balance Theory was first developed by Fritz Heider with Gestalt influences. Gestalt psychology posits that there is a tendency towards perceptual simplicity, such as symmetry and continuation. Heider extends this principle to social relations, where there are balanced and imbalanced states. When applied to attitudes, it is defined in triadic relation between three elements: a Person (P), an Other person (O), and an Attitude Object (X). Attitude is the relation between two elements, defined as either positive or negative, resulting in 8 distinct triads. If the number of positive relations is odd, the triad is balanced; vice versa.

=== Congruity Theory ===
Proposed by Osgood and Tannebaum, the principle of congruity claims that attitude change always results in increased congruity for the individual. Compared to balance theory, congruity theory allows for gradations of relation between elements and introduces a formula to quantitatively predict attitude change. There are five variables in the formula: point of resolution for object (R_{O}), point of resolution for source (R_{S}), prior attitude toward object (A_{O}), prior attitude toward source (A_{S}), and direction of assertion (d; no gradation). The frame of reference is the individual; the source is the other communicator; and the assertion indicates the source's attitude.

=== Dissonance Theory ===
The cognitive dissonance theory proposed by Leon Festinger, suggests that cognitive discomfort (dissonance) occurs when an individual's behaviour and beliefs do not align. In his famous work A Theory of Cognitive Dissonance, he suggests that the existence of cognitive dissonance automatically leads to pressures to reduce it. The three main ways in which we reduce this postdecision dissonance are 1) changing or revoking the decision, 2) changing cognition about the alternatives, and 3) establishing cognitive overlap.

Changing or revoking the decision occurs immediately after a decision, when the dissonance is not overwhelming as the choice was likely to have been the most favourable at the moment. The discomfort of slight dissonance may tempt undoing the decision, but Leon Festinger points out that simply reversing the decision does not reduce dissonance–as what should be reversed to properly reduce dissonance is the cognitive elements that were involved in the decision making, not the mere decision itself. Alternatively, individuals may psychologically revoke the decision by denying responsibility, attributing the decision to external forces. For example, someone who regrets accepting a particular job offer may convince themselves that they had no real choice in it and that they had to accept it.

The more common way individuals attempt to reduce postdecision dissonance is by altering one's perception of the alternative decision. By reframing or reducing the positive elements of the rejected option, and the negative elements in the chosen one, one can increase cognitive consonance and lessen discomfort. This approach is not always effective as for if contradictory evidence emerges, dissonance may persist despite cognitive efforts to justify the decision. Lastly, creating cognitive overlap occurs when individuals find or invent similarities between the chosen and unchosen alternatives; when alternatives share common elements, dissonance decreases partly because the decision feels less like a loss. In practice, this may look like reframing all the options, including the chosen and rejected, as all serving towards the same end (e.g., a child choosing between a ball game and a circus may come to realise that both serve the purpose of entertainment making the decision less conflicting). Another method is to identify the directly overlapping aspects (e.g., "the circus will also have ball games for me to play!").

== Factors influencing consistency ==
Recent research has shown that attitudes accurately predict behaviour only under certain conditions:

=== Cultural factors ===
Culture plays a significant role in attitude-behaviour consistency as it shapes the factors that influence whether attitudes accurately predict behaviour. In individualistic cultures, social behaviour is more likely to be predicted by the personal attitudes that individuals hold. In these cultures, there is a higher emphasis on independence and people's behaviours are predicted by their self-interest and personal preferences. Independent self-construals are fostered in individualistic cultures, where people see themselves as unique from others. This type of self-construal is categorized with Western cultures, with European Americans emphasizing individuality and placing high importance on their internal attributes. As a result, individual concerns are placed above the concerns of the group. This encourages acting based on personal beliefs, which results in higher attitude-behaviour consistency.

In contrast to this, the behaviours of individuals in collectivist cultures is more strongly predicted by social norms and group behaviours. Due to this, collectivist cultures have been predicted to have less consistency as their behaviour is more likely to be influenced by contextual factors. In cultures that promote collectivism, it is much more important for individuals to learn to adapt and be flexible, rather than be consistent. Interdependent self-construals are fostered in collectivist cultures, where individuals emphasize themselves as part of social relationships. This includes Asian, Southern European, and Latin American countries. These cultures promote the importance of adjusting one's behaviour according to the perception of other people's thoughts, feelings, and actions. Because of these factors, individuals in collectivist cultures are more likely to adapt their behaviour to fit the situation or social group they are in, which ultimately reduces attitude-behaviour consistency.

Cultural contexts play a role in determining whether individuals perceive their actions as driven by personal choice or social responsibility. Individualistic cultures show stronger attitude-behaviour consistency because of the emphasis on autonomy and individual uniqueness, while collectivist cultures generally show weaker attitude-behaviour consistency because of the strong emphasis on adapting to social expectations.

=== Contextual factors ===
When both the attitude and behaviour occur under similar social contexts/situations, contextual factors are likely involved. A person's attitude and behaviour both vary from situation to situation. A college freshman may disapprove of binge drinking, only to subsequently become socialized to practice and celebrate doing so in the course of tailgating.

Social desirability bias may also skew self-reported attitudes that affect prima-facie attitude-behaviour consistency. Studies making claims about behaviours based on reports when behaviours may be seen as desirable may be particularly sensitive to the attitudinal fallacy. Unfortunately, there is no consensus on which attitudes are socially desirable and attitudes may be situational hence vary from setting to setting.

=== Individual factors ===
Low self-monitoring enhances attitude-consistent behaviour because individuals are less influenced by external social cues or expectations. Individuals who are low self-monitors, act in accordance with their own beliefs and attitudes without adapting to social pressures so their behaviors are more aligned with their attitudes.

High self monitoring may decrease attitude-consistent behaviour because more precedence is given to external pressures over internal beliefs. High self-monitors are more responsive to social contexts, and will often adjust their behaviour to conform to social expectations.

=== Attitude accessibility and strength ===
==== Accessibility ====
The Attitude Accessibility Theory, developed by Russell H. Fazio suggests that attitudes are more likely to guide behaviours when they are easily accessible in memory. This theory focuses on the strength of association between an attitude object and an individual's evaluation of it. It is measured by an individual's reaction time to evaluate an attitude object where faster responses suggest higher accessibility. Determinants of accessibility include the frequency of activation and recency of activation.

The factor of attitude accessibility is important when the accessibility of underlying affective and cognitive components of attitudes are aligned. For instance, when an attitude is assessed in a context where people primarily focus on its cognitive aspects, but the behaviour occurs in a situation where the affective components of the attitude are more prominent, attitude-behaviour consistency will be weak.

==== Strength ====
More broadly, attitude strength has been defined as referring to the durability and strength of attitudes, with stronger attitudes being considered to be ones that are stable, accessible, and resistant to change, which is why they are more likely to predict consistent behaviour. Some components of attitude strength, as has been shown in work by Fazio, include certainty, personal importance, and direct experience. These kinds of attitudes are thought to be more resistant to persuasion, and therefore more likely to predict behavior.

Weak attitudes are more likely to be influenced by context, situational factors, and social pressures, thus leading to less consistent behavior. Weak and/or ambivalent attitudes were shown to result in lower ability to predict behavior, with low consistency between the expressed beliefs and the actual behaviors of individuals. When attitudes are strong, they have a greater influence on behaviour; individuals are more motivated to behave in ways that align with their beliefs and feelings towards the attitude object, leading to a higher level of attitude-behavior consistency. Thus, individuals with stronger attitudes might be less impacted by situational factors.

== Applications in research ==
Attitude-behavior consistency is an important concept for social science research because claims are often made about behavior based on evidence which is really about attitudes. The attitudinal fallacy is committed when verbal data are used to support claims not about what people believe or say, but what they do. Data collection methods based on self-report like surveys, and interviews are vulnerable to the attitudinal fallacy if they attempt to measure behavior and if reported attitudes are inconsistent with the behavior.

Research methods that directly observe behaviors avoid the attitudinal fallacy as a matter of course. However many kinds of behavior are not easily observed, especially not in ways amenable to statistical reporting. Ethnography can make rich observations and descriptions of behavior and allow for comparison between behavior and attitude. Unfortunately, in general ethnographic data cannot be used to draw statistically generalizable conclusions about behavior in a population. Moreover, ethnographers can still commit the attitudinal fallacy if they rely on quotations as evidence for behaviors. Experiments in laboratories make it possible to observe behavior, although people's behavior in laboratory conditions may not reflect their behavior in real-world situations. Internet research makes it possible to study a wide array of behaviors that leave traces online. Data from the Internet of things and sensors that record behavior like from location tracking may make it possible to measure more kinds of behavior that avoids the attitudinal fallacy. Still, some kinds of behavior are difficult to study other than through interviews or surveys, and the knowledge produced in such cases may be still useful. The possibility of inconsistency between behavior and reported attitudes is always a concern.

Methods that are limited by their inability to measure behavior can still contribute to important understandings. These include how meaning is created, the significance of events to individuals, emotion, semiotics, representation and opinions.

== Examples ==
- In the 1930s Richard LaPiere asked 251 hotel proprietors if they would serve Chinese guests and only 1 said yes. However, when he followed around a young Chinese couple that visited the hotels they were only denied service once.
- Americans on average report going to church twice as much as they actually do. But Europeans accurately self-report church attendance.
- Although most employers in an audit study reported that they were willing to give job interviews to young male black ex-offenders, they were unlikely to provide interviews when presented with opportunities to interview men appearing to be so.
- People in health studies where they are asked to report how much food they eat tend to report eating less than they actually do.
- When investigating the bystander effect, people claim a far greater willingness to intervene in situations than is observed in practice in a naturalistic setting. This type of result has implications for all survey-based research.
