= Mere-measurement effect =

Phenomenon in behavioural psychology

The mere-measurement effect is a phenomenon used in behavioural psychology. It explains that merely measuring or questioning an individual's intentions or anticipated regret changes his or her subsequent behavior. The mere-measurement effect has been demonstrated in multiple behavioural contexts both general and specific. But it is most commonly used to explain consumer behaviour. In this context, the effect implies that simply questioning one's intentions behind a purchase influences his or her decision making in the market.

The most well-known coiner of the mere-measurement effect is Vicki Morwitz, a marketing professor at NYU who addressed the term in hers, Eric Johnson and David Schmittlein's article Does Measuring Intent Change Behaviour? Morwitz is well known for her demonstration of the effect in the context of purchasing behaviour. In 1993, she demonstrated that simply questioning people's intentions towards buying a computer or car would increase the likelihood of purchasing these items. Alongside the mere-measurement hypothesis, Morwitz et al. suggested a polarization hypothesis. It implies that the questioning of one's intent to buy something would increase their purchase rate. Yet, repeatedly questioning one's intent would decrease their purchase rate. Morwitz et al. outlines four explanations of the mere-measurement effect in the context of consumer behaviour specifically. Apart from purchasing behaviour, Morwtiz has demonstrated the effect in other behaviours. For instance, in the context of survey validity and the behaviour of survey respondents, the mere act of formulating a way to report an answer to a survey question can influence a respondent's actual response.

== Explanations of the effect ==
In Does Measuring Intent Change Behaviour? Morwitz et al. outlines two main explanations behind this effect. Firstly, answering one's question on behavioural intention would increase accessibility towards their own attitude. Therefore, their subsequent behaviour will be more in line with the attitude driving it. Secondly, answering one's intention question will cause one to carry out heavy cognitive work which may lead to an attitude and intention change, and finally a behavioural change. These are the two basic explanations of the mere-measurement effect and can be applied to multiple behavioural contexts.

Yet, Gavan Fitzsimons and Morwitz expand these explanations more in depth in their later article written in 2004– The Mere-Measurement Effect: Why Does Measuring Intentions Change Actual Behavior. It expands on Morwtiz's previous two explanations of the effect into four proposed explanations for why measuring intentions has an effect on behaviour. The mere-measurement effect can result from either all, a few or one of these explanations.

1. Enhanced label accessibility– Questioning one's intentions increase the salience of feelings and thoughts associated with engaging in a certain behaviour.
2. Increased attitude accessibility– It enhances the extent to which one can access their attitudes towards performing a behaviour, especially towards the most salient option within a set of choices.
3. Attitude polarisation– Measuring intent may lead to a polarisation of attitudes toward the most salient option and will therefore change the subsequent behaviour.
4. Enhanced intention accessibility– Questioning one's intentions will make the performance of these intentions and specific behaviours more accessible as a whole.

== Theoretical background ==
Many theories and past literature have made a connection between intention and subsequent behaviour before the term mere-measurement effect was invented. One example Morwitz et al. refers to is Icek Ajzen's theory of planned behaviour, Martin Fishbein and Ajzen's theory of reasoned action, as well as research conducted by Shepherd, Hardwich and Warshaw 1988.

== Research into other behaviours ==
=== Self-erasing error of prediction ===
This term was invented by Steven Sherman in 1980. He conducted an experiment and demonstrated the strong impact pre-behavioural, cognitive processes has on one's decision-making and behaviour. Sherman found that participants over-predicted the probability of them performing a socially desirable behaviour. He concluded their errors of prediction as self-erasing. Moreover, participants were more likely to perform the specific behaviour after making these predictions.

=== Voting behaviour ===
A later demonstration of the effect was done by marketing professor at the University of Washington, Anthony Greenwald. In 1987, he demonstrated that students who were asked about their voting intentions were more likely to vote in elections than those who were not asked. Both Sherman and Greenwald showcase the effect predictions have on one's thoughts about performing the actual behaviour and the behaviour itself.

=== Blood donation ===
In 2008, Gaston Godin, Paschal Sheeran, Mark T Conner and Marc Germain in their article – Asking Questions Changes Behavior: Mere Measurement Effects on Frequency of Blood Donation demonstrated that completing a survey on the topic of blood donation increased the likelihood of a respondent to donate blood.

=== Physical activity ===
In 2011, Godin, Ariane Bélanger-Gravel, Steve Amireault, Marie-Claude Vohl, and Louis Pérusse showcased that completing a survey on participant's cognition towards leisurely and physical activity. The found that higher levels of physical activity was observed in participants that completed the questionnaire as opposed to participants that didn't.
