= Expectancy-value theory =

Behavioral theory

Expectancy–value theory has been developed in many different fields including education, health, communications, marketing and economics. Although the model differs in its meaning and implications for each field, the general idea is that there are expectations as well as values or beliefs that affect subsequent behavior.

== Education model ==
=== History and model overview ===
John William Atkinson developed the expectancy–value theory in the 1950s and 1960s in an effort to understand the achievement motivation of individuals. In the 1980s, Jacquelynne Eccles expanded this research into the field of education. According to expectancy–value theory, students' achievement and achievement related choices are most proximally determined by two factors: expectancies for success, and subjective task values. Expectancies refer to how confident an individual is in his or her ability to succeed in a task whereas task values refer to how important, useful, or enjoyable the individual perceives the task. Theoretical and empirical work suggests that expectancies and values interact to predict important outcomes such as engagement, continuing interest, and academic achievement. Other factors, including demographic characteristics, stereotypes, prior experiences, and perceptions of others' beliefs and behaviors affect achievement related outcomes indirectly through these expectancies and values. This model has most widely been applied and used in research in the field of education.

=== Expectancies ===
Expectancies are specific beliefs individuals have regarding their success on certain tasks they will carry out in the short-term future or long-term future. An individual's expectancies are related to their behaviors as well as the choices they make. Expectancies are related to ability-beliefs such as self-concept and self-efficacy. Self-concept is a domain specific concept that involves one's beliefs about their own abilities based on their past experiences in the specific domain. Self-efficacy is the belief that an individual has the ability to successfully engage in a future specific task or series of related tasks

=== Subjective task values ===
According to Eccles and colleagues subjective task value can be thought of as the motivation that allows an individual to answer the question "Do I Want to do This Activity and Why?" Subjective task values can be broken into four subcategories: Attainment Value (Importance for identity or self), Intrinsic Value (Enjoyment or Interest), Utility Value (Usefulness or Relevance), and Cost (loss of time, overly-high effort demands, loss of valued alternatives, or negative psychological experiences such as stress). Traditionally, attainment value and intrinsic value are more highly correlated. What's more, these two constructs tend to be related to intrinsic motivation, interest, and task persistence. Alternatively, utility value has both intrinsic and extrinsic components. and has been related to both intrinsic and extrinsic outcomes such as course performance and interest. Other research shows that utility value has time-dependent characteristics as well. Cost has been relatively neglected in the empirical research; however, the construct has received some attention more recently. Feather combined subjective task values with more universal human values and suggested that the former are just one type of general human motives that help to direct behavior.

=== Applications ===
==== Developmental trajectories ====
Researchers have found that expectancies and values can be distinguished as separate types of motivation as early as 6 years old. Similarly, types of value (e.g., attainment vs. utility) can be distinguished within an academic domain as early as fifth grade. Generally speaking, Eccles and colleagues implicate a wide array of different factors that determine an individual's expectancies and values, including:

- the cultural milieu
- socializer's beliefs and behaviors
- differential aptitudes of the individual
- previous achievement-related experiences
- individual perceptions of social beliefs
- individual's interpretations of experiences
- affective memories
- general goals
- self-concepts

Experts agree that student motivation tends to decline throughout their time in school. Longitudinal research has confirmed this general trend of motivational decline and also demonstrated that motivation is domain specific. Researchers have also demonstrated that there are gender differences in motivation. Motivation decline is particularly steep for Math achievement, but less so for reading or sports domains among both boys and girls. Researchers offer two general explanations for these declines in motivation. The first is that students' conceptualizations of different domains become more complex and nuanced—they differentiate between subdomains, which results in an appearance of mean-level decrease. In fact, children as young as 11 years old have demonstrated that they can differentiate between academic domains. The second is that the focus of their environment changes as they age. As students reach higher grades, the focus shifts from learning to achievement. In fact, a large body of research exists showing that shifts from learning to performance as an educational focus can be detrimental to student motivation.

==== Interventions ====
Expectancy–value theory constructs can and have been applied to intervention programs that strive to change motivational beliefs. These interventions are able to increase expectancy and value or decrease cost. Such interventions not only target motivation, but also ultimately increase general student achievement and help to close traditionally problematic achievement gaps. For example, value- focused interventions have been developed to help teachers design their curriculum in ways that allow students to see the connections between the material they learn in the classroom and their own lives. This intervention is able to boost student's performance and interest, particularly for students who have low initial expectancy. According to the expectancy–value theory, this intervention is effective because it increases students interest in the material.

== Psychology, health, communications, marketing, and economics model ==
Expectancy–value theory was originally created in order to explain and predict individual's attitudes toward objects and actions. Originally the work of psychologist Martin Fishbein, the theory states that attitudes are developed and modified based on assessments about beliefs and values. Primarily, the theory attempts to determine the mental calculations that take place in attitude development. Expectancy–value theory has been used to develop other theories and is still utilized today in numerous fields of study.

=== History ===
Dr. Martin Fishbein is credited with developing the expectancy–value theory (EVT) in the early to mid-1970s. It is sometimes referred to as Fishbein's expectancy–value theory or simply expectancy–value model. The primary work typically cited by scholars referring to EVT is Martin Fishbein and Icek Ajzen's 1975 book called Belief, Attitude, Intention, and Behavior: An Introduction to Theory and Research. The seed work of EVT can be seen in Fishbein's doctoral dissertation, A Theoretical and Empirical Investigation of the Interrelation between Belief about an Object and the Attitude toward that Object (1961, UCLA) and two subsequent articles in 1962 and 1963 in the journal Human Relations. Fishbein's work drew on the writings of researchers such as Ward Edwards, Milton J. Rosenberg, Edward Tolman, and John B. Watson.

=== Concepts ===
EVT has three basic components. First, individuals respond to novel information about an item or action by developing a belief about the item or action. If a belief already exists, it can and most likely will be modified by new information. Second, individuals assign a value to each attribute that a belief is based on. Third, an expectation is created or modified based on the result of a calculation based on beliefs and values. For example, a student finds out that a professor has a reputation for being humorous. The student assigns a positive value to humor in the classroom, so the student has the expectation that their experience with the professor will be positive. When the student attends class and finds the professor humorous, the student calculates that it is a good class. EVT also states that the result of the calculation, often called the "attitude", stems from complex equations that contain many belief/values pairs. Fishbein and Ajzen (1975) represented the theory with the following equation where attitudes (a) are a factorial function of beliefs (b) and values (v).

Theory of reasoned action: Formula In its simplest form, the TRA can be expressed as the following equation: $BI {{=}} (AB)W_1 + (SN)W_2$

where: $BI$ = behavioral intention

$AB$ = one's attitude toward performing the behavior

$W$ = empirically derived weights

$SN$ = one's subjective norm related to performing the behavior

(Source: Hale, 2002)

=== Current usage ===
In the late 1970s and early 1980s, Fishbein and Ajzen expanded expectancy–value theory into the theory of reasoned action (TRA). Later Ajzen posited the theory of planned behavior (TPB) in his book Attitudes, Personality, and Behavior (1988). Both TRA and TPB address predictive and explanatory weaknesses with EVT and are still prominent theories in areas such as health communication research, marketing, and economics. Although not used as much since the early 1980s, EVT is still utilized in research within fields as diverse as audience research (Palmgreen & Rayburn, 1985) advertising (Shoham, Rose, & Kahle 1998; Smith & Vogt, 1995), child development (Watkinson, Dwyer, & Nielsen, 2005), education (Eklof, 2006; Ping, McBride, & Breune, 2006), health communication (Purvis Cooper, Burgoon, & Roter, 2001; Ludman & Curry, 1999), and organization communication (Westaby, 2002).

== See also ==
- Theory of planned behavior
