= Self-monitoring =

Psychology concept introduced in the 1970s by Mark Snyder

Self-monitoring is the extent to which a person monitors their self-presentations, expressive behavior, and nonverbal affective displays. The concept was introduced in the 1970s by American social psychologist Mark Snyder. He held that human beings generally differ in substantial ways in their abilities and desires to engage in expressive controls (see dramaturgy). Self-monitoring is defined as a personality trait that refers to an ability to regulate behavior to accommodate social situations. People concerned with their expressive self-presentation (see impression management) tend to closely monitor their audience in order to ensure appropriate or desired public appearances. Self-monitors try to understand how individuals and groups will perceive their actions. Some personality types commonly act spontaneously (low self-monitors) and others are more apt to purposely control and consciously adjust their behavior (high self-monitors). Recent studies suggest that a distinction should be made between acquisitive and protective self-monitoring due to their different interactions with metatraits. This differentiates the motive behind self-monitoring behaviours: for the purpose of acquiring appraisal from others (acquisitive) or protecting oneself from social disapproval (protective).

== Low vs high self monitors ==
Someone who is high in self-monitoring is more likely to align their thoughts, feelings, and behaviors to that of their partners. In comparison to low self-monitors, high self monitors participate in more expressive control and have a concern for situational appropriateness. High self-monitors can act like "social chameleons": they change the way they present themselves depending upon who they are with. Some traits of high self-monitors include readily and easily modifying their behavior in response to the demands of the situation, whereas low self-monitors care little about modifying their behavior in response to the situation and tend to maintain the same opinions and attitudes regardless of the situation. High self-monitors find it much easier to modify their behavior based on the situation than low self-monitors do. High self-monitors would be more likely to change their beliefs and opinions depending on who they are talking to, while low self-monitors would tend to be consistent throughout all situations. This has been studied mainly in correspondence with relationships. Compared to low self-monitors, high self-monitors will have more dating and sexual partners, are more interested in having sex with people they are not in love with, and are more likely to have had sex with someone only once, as well as be more likely to deceive potential romantic partners. High self-monitors are more likely to choose a romantic partner who is attractive but unsociable, while low self-monitors are more likely to choose a partner who is unattractive but sociable. High self-monitors are also more likely to take on leadership positions than low self-monitors.

Differences in individuals' propensity for self-monitoring have a heritable component, but the likelihood that a person becomes a high (or low) self-monitor also varies between social contexts and groups. For example, on average, sexual minorities (such as gay men, lesbians, and bisexuals) are more likely to be high self-monitors than their otherwise similar heterosexual counterparts, but this difference exists primarily in geographic areas where the stigma against minority sexual orientations is strong. In the United States, for example, differences in self-monitoring based on sexual orientation have been documented in rural areas and small towns, but do not seem to exist in the context of large cities, which tend to be more tolerant of minority sexual orientations.

== Scale ==
Snyder's self monitoring scale was developed in 1974. It measures whether or not an individual has the will and ability to change how they are perceived by utilizing impression management in various social interactions. The score is based on twenty five true or false statements that the individual answers according to their thought process and is used to determine how an individual may manipulate nonverbal signals and adjust their actions according to a situation. The twenty five statements are intended to identify a person's concern about their own presentation and social appropriateness when it comes to social events. This may be seen by the way in which they speak and what topics they bring up. The statements also imply how a person acts in comparison to the other people in the same setting. By using comparison, people can pick up on cues for how to behave as well as present themselves.The twenty five statements also help to identify how well a person controls expressive behavior as well as how well a person controls expressive behavior in addition to how they act despite certain feelings. For example, because of good self monitoring skills, a person may act kind and tolerant of someone whom they dislike. Lastly, these statements help us to identify how different situations tailor a person's behavior. An individual may act one way in a situation and a complete opposite way in the next situation. The score is calculated based on the individuals response to the True or False questions. A low score on the self-monitoring scale can range anywhere from 0-8 and a high score ranges from 15 to 22.

== Individualistic differences ==
=== Social approach ===
It has been argued that individualism should influence self-monitoring. Cultures high on individualism focus on the self, not others. In individualistic cultures, knowing the context is not necessary to predict others' behavior; thus people from individualistic cultures are more likely to be low self-monitors. Cultures low on individualism (i.e., collectivist cultures), in contrast, value conformity to ingroups and group memberships. In collectivistic cultures, knowing the context and social status of the other person is essential to predicting his or her behavior.

On the surface, it might appear that highly individualistic cultures would reinforce low self-monitoring and collectivistic cultures would reinforce high self-monitoring. This, however, is not the case. High self-monitors imagine what the prototypic person for the situation would be and try to be that person, while low self-monitors "draw upon an enduring self-image or self-conception that represents knowledge of her or his characteristic actions in the behavioral domains relevant to the situation". Members of collectivistic cultures' self-conception include their relationship with others present in the situation. They, therefore, must take status relationships into consideration when deciding how to behave in a particular situation. This suggests they do not base their behavior on how a prototypic person would behave in the situation.

==== Job performance ====
It has been shown that there is a significant relation between an individual's performance at his/her job and his or her ability to change their self-presentation in order to most adapt to the situation. Self-monitoring was most important during early tenure. This history of finding individual difference variables that relate to job performance has been unsuccessful. Some of the reasons why it is difficult to use individual difference variables to predict job performance is because there is a failure to consider contextual effects such as informational influence and pressures for conformity. Other difficulties are a result from attempting to use personality measures without having a good understanding of the nature of the job and the individual's development in the job. This results in the individual differences being assessed without fully understanding why they should affect job performance directly or how they may affect an individual's performance when you take into consideration increased job knowledge that an individual may gain through experience.

One case that shows how success could be related to individual predispositions is in organizations where individuals hold boundary-spanning positions. Boundary spanners purpose is to filter and transfer information across organizational boundaries. The individuals that are responsible for this transfer of information may be in roles both inside and outside the organization. Therefore, they should be able to respond to social and informational stimuli, inside and outside the organization. The nature of this job makes it likely that an individual's performance in this role is likely to be influenced by the degree to which that person can perceive, understand and adapt to different social situations as appropriate. In essence, an individual who is a high self-monitor would be better at responding to different social cues and hence be more equipped to transfer information effectively across organizational borders and consequently be a higher performer.

Over time, however, the competitive advantage that high self-monitors have over low self-monitors is reduced as job knowledge increases through experience and poor performers leave boundary spanning roles.

==== Social impacts ====
Riggio et al., (1982) suggests that self-monitoring as defined by the self-monitoring scale is composed of many elements which are central to social interaction. It was determined that the elements of self-monitoring appear to be "charisma", "performance", and "social sensitivity". Therefore, it is determinable that those with high levels of self-monitoring had greater skill at navigating and bridging social situations, while in contrast, those with lower levels of self-monitoring may struggle in the same situations.

The differences between how high self monitors and low self monitors treat relationships and social situations stem from differences in what they seek to gain out of their social life and their understanding of self. High self-monitors view their self as a product of social interactions and their own adaptability in various social settings. In contrast, low self-monitors view their self as a product of personal dispositions and their effects on social situations. High self-monitors look for friends with similar activity preferences, while low self-monitors look for friends with similar attitudes. High self-monitors also generally end up becoming close to other high self-monitors, and vice versa with low self-monitors.

==== Relationships ====
High self-monitors look for a social context that allows flexibility and adaptability to play a multitude of roles without role conflict. High self-monitors are more likely to believe in the idea that there are multiple people one can love, and focus on attributes such as physical attractiveness, sex appeal, social status, and financial resources. In turn, the attachments high self-monitors form with their significant others are more avoidant, and they can feel uncomfortable with significant others who have higher levels of intimacy than themselves. Low self-monitors, on the other hand, look for a social context that gives them the freedom and security to express their emotions and dispositions freely without any interpersonal conflicts. They are more likely to believe in the idea of "one true love" and look for attributes such as personality desirability, similarity of values and beliefs, and other dispositions like honesty, responsibility, and kindness. This leads to more secure relationships being formed, and their level of intimacy is not a problem.

== Historical context ==
=== Major case studies ===
There are many cases in which self-monitoring is used as a variable of interest. Several recent studies look into the relationship between self-monitoring and on-task behavior, workplace utilization, and leadership positions.

Self-monitoring is increasingly being used to increase on-task behavior in children, and there is a growing body of evidence supporting its effectiveness with a variety of groups and in various settings. Self-monitoring typically uses technology to deliver audible or tactile cues at selected intervals to prompt a child to observe and record his/her own behavior.

A pilot study regarding on-task behavior was done with two high school students with symptoms of learning disabilities. These students were trained using a self-monitoring application and given prompts, and the results showed positive, stable improvements in their on-task behavior after each individual's self-monitoring was increased.

When looking at theoretical and empirical evidence in self-monitoring in the workplace, research indicates that high self-monitors are proficient in meeting social expectations and increasing their leadership outlook. Results from the study done by Day and Schleicher emphasize that the higher the individual scores on the scale, the more successful the individual tends to be as determined from the criteria of getting along, getting ahead, and making sense.

The relationship between self-monitoring and career mobility in particular was studied with a research pool of Masters of Business Administration graduates. High self-monitors are reported to be more likely to change employers, change work locations, and achieve promotions in comparison to low self-monitors.

=== Controversy and confusion ===
Self-monitoring, despite all the research and theory behind it, has been shrouded in controversy and confusion with respect to its actual existence. The initial confusion arose because factor analyses were conducted which revealed that the structure of most items on the Self-Monitoring Scale was multifactorial. Three factors appeared necessary to account for the correlations between the items for the measure, interpreted as Acting (e.g. "I would probably make a good actor"), Extraversion (e.g. "In a group of people, I am rarely the center of attention"), and Other-Directedness (e.g. "I guess I put on a show to entertain or impress other people"). Though these factor analyses are used as instruments to measure the level of self-monitoring, they have prompted the question of the existence of self-monitoring. Snyder and Gangestad (2000) argued through a series of quantitative experiments that it is indeed a real unitary phenomenon by showing that external criterion measures representing a wide array of phenomena relating to expressive control all point to self-monitoring as a real causal phenomena.

Additionally, they argue that the external criterion variables are generally most directly tapped by the Self-Monitoring Scale rather than being tapped by the measures of Extraversion, Social Surgency, or Other-Directedness, meaning that Self-Monitoring can better describe the factors that contribute to a person's personality than the combination of these. Measures of these three factors relate to the self-monitoring criterion only with respect to the fact that they have similar variance with the self-monitoring dimension, with Other-Directedness being the most highly related to Self-Monitoring. Hence, through answering these two questions, doubts regarding the existence of the Self-Monitoring phenomena were clearly dispelled.

== Similar processes ==
=== Self presentation ===
There is a strong connection between self-monitoring and self-presentation, as it's proven that people who are high self-monitoring have greater cognitive access to self-presentation related concepts than people who are low self-monitoring. Through a 100-person experiment, it was found out that high-self monitors more quickly linked positive personality traits to themselves following exposure to impression-related words, proving high self-monitors possess a heightened capacity to cognitively process self-presentation information. High self-monitors rely on social information to guide their self-presentations since they vary their presentations based on different social cues. They are also, compared to low self-monitors, more likely to recall personal information about an upcoming interaction partner, are better able to judge emotional displays, are more skilled at decoding nonverbal behaviors, show better performance on interpersonal perception tasks, are more focused on their interaction partners, and are more inclined to seek out and consider more information about an audience when trying to convey a particular identity.

Essentially, Tyler, Kearns and McIntyres argue that high self-monitoring people are more likely to seek out social cues and information through interactions, following which they will employ this information in their behaviour, hence portraying a self-presentation or image that they want to. Additionally, they are more sensitive to social cues and social information. People low in self-monitoring, however, would behave as themselves in most cases and hence not have an option in the self-presentation that they project, as well as being less sensitive to social information present around them.

=== Social psychology theory ===
There are several theories within social psychology that are closely related to the self-monitoring construct. Icek Ajzen argues that subjective norms are an important antecedent to determining behavioral intention in the theory of reasoned action/theory of planned behavior. High self-monitors tend to weigh subjective norms more heavily than low self-monitors. Studies that evaluate private attitudes and public actions include Ajzen, Timko, and White, 1982; and DeBono and Omoto, 1993. Informational cascades theory, which is related to observation learning theory, was developed by Bikhchandani, Hirshleifer, and Welch (1992) and describes how people will follow, sometimes blindly, the actions of others. The self-monitoring construct would identify that high self-monitors may be more susceptible to informational cascades and herd mentality. This can be a problem if a culture of groupthink is part of the organizations decision-making process. High self-monitors are more motivated to attain high social status than low self-monitors. Research drawing on the elaboration likelihood model suggests that high self-monitors, more than low self-monitors, react favorably to peripheral processing of advertising images consistent with high social status.
