= Difficulty of engagement =

Behavior change concept

Difficulty of engagement is a notion in the Campbell paradigm, a model of behavior change with person-independent difficulty.

== Motivation ==
Difficulty is considered a key predictor of behavior in psychology and is included in most recognized models of behavior change, such as the theory of planned behavior. Most of these models rely on people's perceptions and estimates of behavioral difficulty. That is, difficulty is considered to be subjective and person-dependent. Obviously, perceived difficulty varies by individual.

A more objective measure of difficulty is desirable, e.g., for environmental or energy policy, because people may misperceive the difficulty of behaviors, possibly because affected by mood or current circumstances.

== The Campbell Paradigm ==
The Campbell paradigm was proposed by Kaiser et al. as a model of behavior change with person-independent difficulty. The model treats the likelihood of individual behavior as a function of attitude and of the difficulty of engaging in this behavior. The more demanding these barriers are, the more favorable attitude towards a general goal, such as environment protection. The relation between difficulty of behaviors, attitudes and behaviors can be computed using a one-parameter logistic Rasch model and yield the proportion of persons that engage in a given behavior.

== See also ==
- Attitude-behavior consistency
