= Behavior theory =

Behavior theory can refer to:

- The collective behavior theory, in sociology, the social processes and events which do not reflect existing social structure, but which emerge in a "spontaneous" way.
- The theories of political behavior, in political science, an attempt to quantify and explain the influences that define a person's political views, ideology, and levels of political participation
- The theory of planned behavior, in psychology, refers to attitude toward behavior, subjective norms, and perceived behavioral control, together shape an individual's behavioral intentions and behaviors
- learning theory, in education, describing how information is absorbed, processed, and retained during learning
- behaviorism, in psychology, maintains that behaviors can be described scientifically without recourse either to internal physiological events or to hypothetical constructs such as thoughts and beliefs
