= Campbell paradigm =

Behavioral theory in social psychology

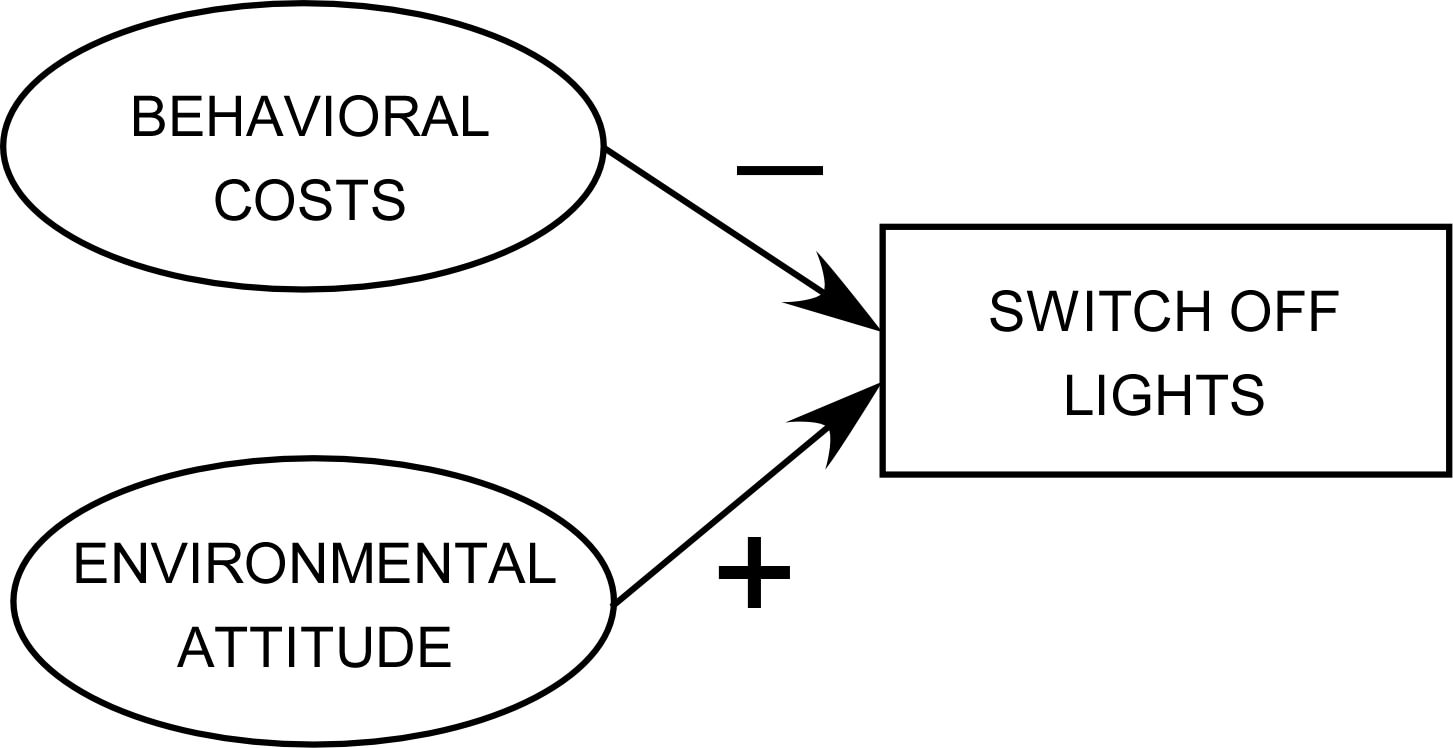
Fig. 1: Behavior within the Campbell Paradigm

The Campbell paradigm is a behavioral theory from social psychology. The paradigm was developed by social psychologist Florian G. Kaiser and his colleagues, Katarzyna Byrka and Terry Hartig, in 2010, building on an earlier suggestion by Donald T. Campbell, after whom the paradigm is named. It offers an explanation for why and when individuals engage in particular behaviors. It is mainly (but not exclusive) applied to behaviors that are aimed at fighting climate change and protecting the environment.

== Overview ==
The Campbell paradigm suggests that behavior (e.g., switching off lights when leaving a room) is typically the result of two factors: a person's commitment to fighting climate change and protecting the environment (i.e., a person's environmental attitude) and the costs that come with a specific behavior (e.g., having to remember to switch off the lights; see Fig. 1). The paradigm stands in contrast to the widespread rational choice theories, whose prototype is the theory of planned behavior in psychology. Rational choice theories explain behavior through a behavior's expected utility.

The Campbell paradigm is based on the controversial assumption that attitude and behavior are genuinely consistent. Accordingly, behavior arises spontaneously as a manifestation of a person's attitude (quite analogous to the tripartite model of attitude by Rosenberg and Hovland). In contrast to Campbell's deterministic model (in which he aimed to explain engagement), Kaiser and colleagues lowered their aspiration to explaining only the probability of engagement. Thus, they adopted the Rasch model as a less rigid depiction of the paradigm (see the formula and its explanation).

$\ln\left ( \frac{p_{ki}}{1-p_{ki}} \right )=\theta_k-\delta_i$

The Rasch model describes the natural logarithm of the ratio of the probability ($p_{ki}$) that person k will switch off the lights (the specific behavior i) to the inverse probability ($1-p_{ki}$) that person k will not switch off the lights as a function of person k's attitude ($\theta_k$: e.g., his or her environmental attitude) minus all the financial and figurative costs that come with switching off lights ($\delta_i$: e.g., needing to remember to switch off the lights when one leaves a room). This means more or less that k's general attitude ($\theta_k$) along with i's specific costs ($\delta_i$) determine the probability ($p_{ki}$) that behavior i will become manifest should the opportunity arise.

Only if a person's attitude exceeds the costs of a behavior will the behavior have a reasonable chance of manifesting (see Fig. 1). This account of why and when behavior occurs also serves as the theoretical basis for the measurement of individual attitudes.

== Attitude measurement ==
Within the Campbell paradigm, a person's attitude is derived from the behavioral costs that this person will incur to achieve the goal that is implied by the attitude. For example, the goal implied by environmental attitude is to protect the environment, whereas the goal implied by a health-focused attitude is to maintain or restore health.

Behavioral costs include everything that makes behavior objectively more or less demanding: things such as effort, time, and financial costs, but also social norms and expectations, cultural practices, and the antagonistic social preferences that go hand in hand with certain behaviors. To illustrate: Someone with a pronounced preference for Taylor Swift's music (i.e., a person with a strong, positive attitude toward Taylor Swift's music) will generally put forth considerable effort and spend large amounts of money to attend one of her concerts. By contrast, people with less interest in Taylor Swift's music will attend a concert only if they receive a ticket for free (e.g., as a gift). And those who do not like Taylor Swift's music will change channels when one of her songs is aired.

On the one hand, this example shows that people can engage in different behaviors to express a more or less strong interest in/preference for Taylor Swift's music (e.g., attend a concert, listen to songs on radio). On the other hand, the example also makes clear that whatever a person does to listen to Taylor Swift is accompanied by costs; these costs are again unique to a specific behavior. Consequently, the costs that someone incurs and, thus, the behaviors that someone engages in to attain the attitudinal goal, can be used to determine people's attitude levels. So far, several attitude scales have been developed on the basis of the Campbell paradigm: environmental attitude, attitude toward nature, (negative) attitude toward anthropogenic climate change, health-focused attitude, attitude toward social contacts or privacy in the office, attitude toward one's own mental vigor, and attitude toward social expectations (i.e., people's conformity).

== Behavioral explanation ==
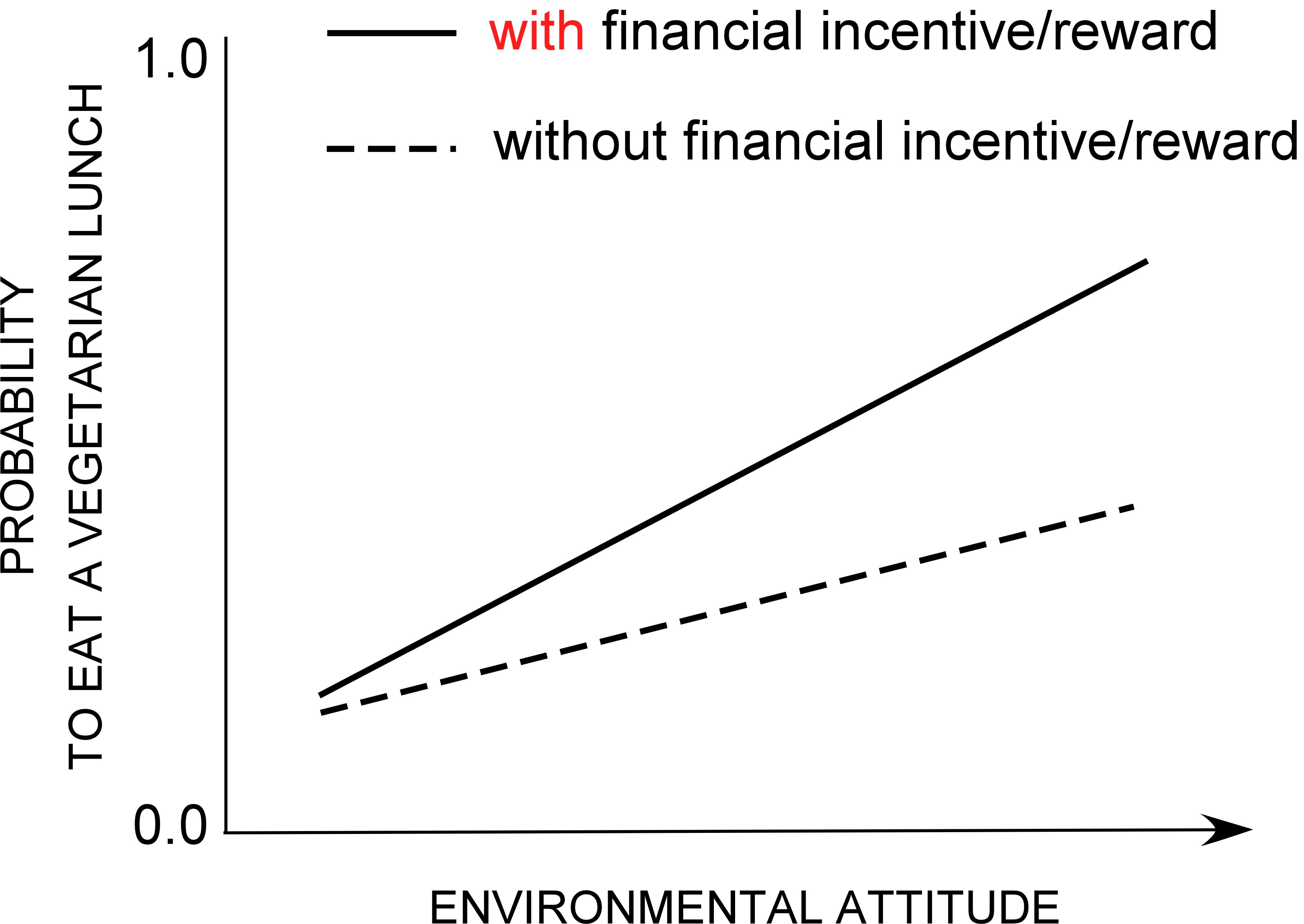
Fig. 2a: Behavior as the cost-moderated function of individual attitude

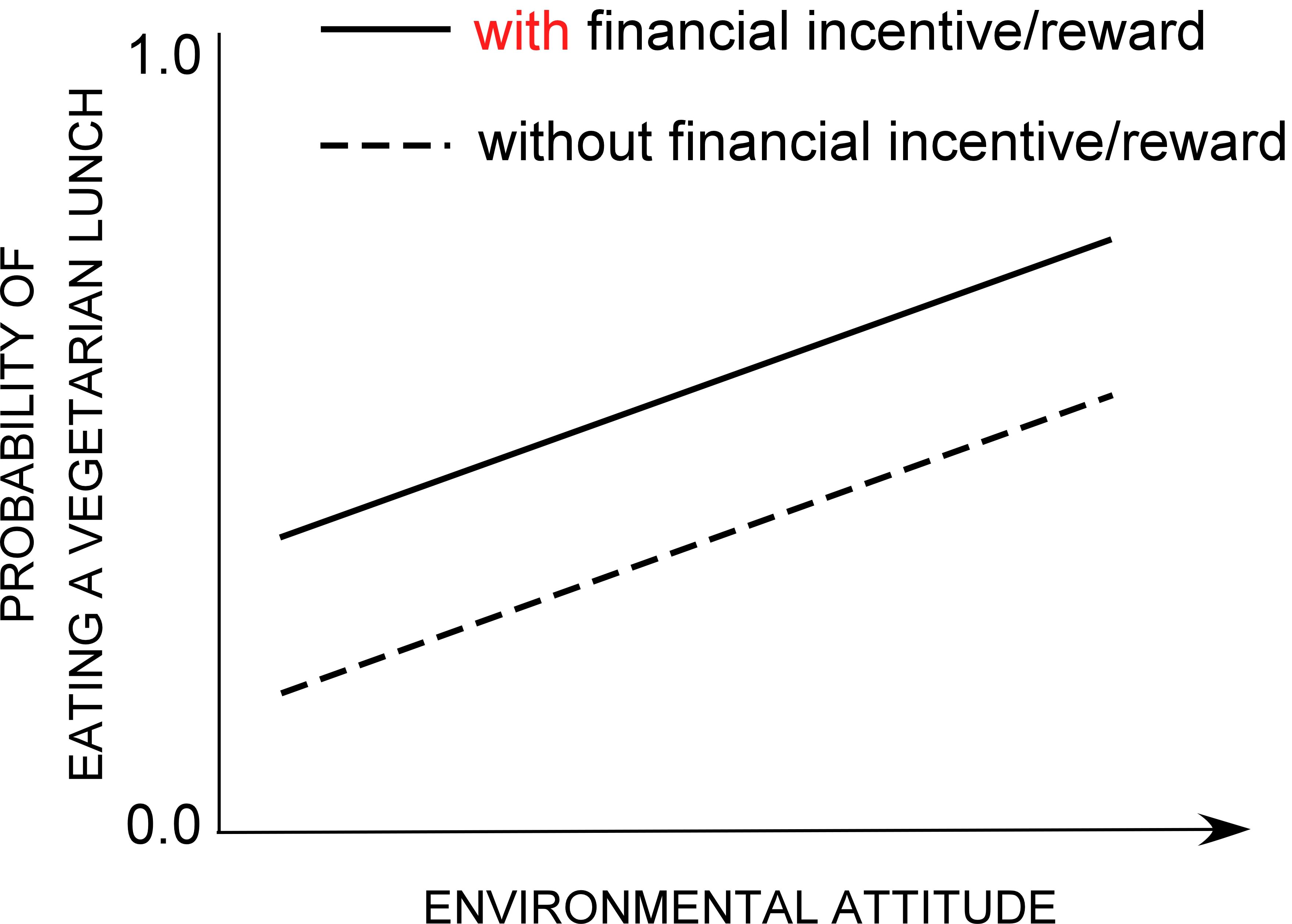
Fig. 2b: Behavior as a function of two countervailing factors (attitude, and the costs of a specific behavior)

In social psychology, attitudes have traditionally reflected people's personal reasons and, thus, their personal behavioral propensities. Analogously, what later became a measure of environmental attitude was initially introduced as a measure of people's propensity to protect the environment. This classical view of attitude as a personal reason is of course ultimately justified only when one is able to reliably and consistently anticipate manifest behavior with an attitude measure, that is, if the notorious attitude-behavior gap does not really exist.

The Campbell paradigm's explanation of behavior is extremely parsimonious as can be concluded from the Rasch model. The likelihood of engaging in a behavior is a function of two countervailing factors: a person's attitude and the sociocultural boundary conditions in which the behavior takes place (see Fig. 1). These objective conditions ultimately determine the specific costs of a behavior. Accordingly, a vegetarian lunch is the result of not only a person's particular level of environmental attitude but also of the sociocultural boundary conditions in which the person's lunch is chosen; for example, the promise of a financial reward makes vegetarian lunches more attractive. The question that remains is "for whom?"

The literature contains a considerable number of (sometimes contradictory) conjunctive behavioral explanations that speak of the cost-moderated efficacy of people's attitudes (see Fig. 2a). By contrast, the Campbell Paradigm suggests that behavioral costs are unrestrictedly behaviorally effective and independent of people's attitude levels (see Fig. 2b). In other words, financial rewards make vegetarian lunches more probable for everyone. This countervailing relationship between behavioral costs and attitude has been repeatedly quasi-experimentally confirmed in environmental protection research.

== Apparent circularity ==
If a person's attitude is derived from the behaviors that the person engages in, we cannot really be surprised to subsequently find that the very same behaviors are explained by this attitude. In other words, what is the point of predicting that Peter will donate money to Greenpeace after we have already seen him donate money to Greenpeace? This apparent circularity is why, for many including Campbell himself, explaining behavior on the basis of the Campbell paradigm seems trivial and thus pointless. However, Kaiser and colleagues have argued that any form of circularity can be comparatively easily avoided.

When individual differences in people's attitude (e.g., in environmental attitude) are derived from verbal behaviors expressed in questionnaires (i.e., opinions, e.g., "protecting the environment is important"; appraisals, e.g., "I regret not doing more to combat climate change"; and claims of engaging in a behavior, e.g., "I recycle paper"), it is by no means trivial to use the correspondingly derived attitudinal differences to predict whether people will actually eat vegetarian lunches. Circularity can thus be avoided if the indicators (i.e., the manifestations used to derive individual levels of an attitude) and the consequences of the attitude (e.g., its manifest effects, the criteria to be explained) are logically and practically distinct.

In order to measure individual differences in a certain attitude, one can therefore use verbal behaviors, such as retrospective self-reports of behavior, stated intentions, appraisals, and opinions. This can be done with questionnaires. As consequences of people's attitude, one can then employ real behavior (e.g., the manifest choice of a vegetarian lunch) or objectively measurable traces of behavior (e.g., the amount of electricity a person consumes annually).

== Independent reviews and tests of the measurement approach ==
- Lange, F., & Dewitte, S. (2019). Measuring pro-environmental behavior: Review and recommendations. Journal of Environmental Psychology, 63, 92–100.
- Gaborieau, J.-B., & Pronello, C. (2021). Validation of a unidimensional and probabilistic measurement scale for pro-environmental behavior by travellers. Transportation, 48, 555–593.
- Kumawat, P., & Pronello, C. (2021). Validating Italian general ecological behaviour questionnaire of travellers using dichotomous Rasch model. Sustainability, 13, 11976.
- Ogunbode, C. A., Henn, L., & Tausch, N. (2020). Context-appropriate environmental attitude measurement in Nigeria using the Campbell paradigm. Environment, Development and Sustainability, 22, 2141–2158.
