= Longbing Cao =

AI and data science researcher

Longbing Cao (Chinese: 操龙兵; born in 1969) is an AI and data science researcher at the University of Technology Sydney, Australia. His broad research interest involves artificial intelligence, data science, behavior informatics, and their enterprise applications.

== Education ==
Cao received one PhD in Pattern Recognition and Intelligent Systems from Chinese Academy of Science and another PhD in Computing Science at the University of Technology Sydney (UTS). He had a bachelor’s degree in electrical automation, and a master's degree in data communication. Cao took a chief technology officer role managing business intelligence system design and implementation in China before he started his academic life in Australia in 2005.

== Career ==
He established and directed the first Australian research centre dedicated to big data analytics: Advanced Analytics Institute at UTS in 2011, where he built the analytics degrees: Master of Analytics and PhD Thesis: Analytics in 2011 at UTS.

He is the inaugural Editor-in-Chief of International Journal of Data Science and Analytics (JDSA), publishing since 2016, and the Editor-in-Chief of IEEE Intelligent Systems, the oldest AI publication in IEEE. He founded the IEEE International Conference on Data Science and Advanced Analytics (DSAA) and established and chairs:

- IEEE Task Force on Data Science and Advanced Analytics
- IEEE Task Force on Behavioral, Economic and Socio-cultural Computing
- ACM SIGKDD Australian and New Zealand Chapter (ANZKDD)

Cao published several books and over 300 papers since 2005. Cao's research focuses include data science(data analytics, data mining, machine learning, information system), artificial intelligence and intelligent systems. His specialized areas include behavior informatics and behavior computing, domain-driven data mining and actionable knowledge discovery, agent mining, non-IID learning, and AI in finance and FinTech. He led a series of enterprise analytics/data science projects for major government and business in domains including social security, taxation, immigration, capital markets, insurance, banking, telecommunication, health, transport, services, and education.

== Awards and honors ==
Cao won the Eureka Prize for Excellence in Data Science in 2019 awarded by the Australian Museum. In 2020, he was elected an ACM Distinguished Member.
