= Mark Snyder (psychologist) =

American social psychologist

Markus Snyder is an American social psychologist who is recognized as the founder of the personality scale called the 25-item self-monitoring scale (later modified to the 18-item self-monitoring scale). In 2013, Snyder works as the McKnight Presidential Chair of Psychology at the University of Minnesota.

== Early life and education ==
Snyder spent his undergraduate years at McGill University where he received his bachelor's degree in 1968. He continued his studies at Stanford University where he would eventually receive a PhD in Psychology in 1972.

== Career ==
A major theme of Snyder's work is to understand how individuals form their own social lives. Snyder studies differences in self-monitoring, and how high or low levels of self-monitoring affect people's understanding of how they adjust to social settings. Snyder's 18-item personality scale can also serve as a device to communicate to people on where they fall on the two concepts of self-monitoring.

Snyder conducts his research at the Center for the Study of the Individual and Society, investigating how and why people become actively involved in doing good for others and for society, and how it affects their perceived level of happiness. He has made seminal contributions to the field of social and personality psychology.
