= International Journal of Data Science and Analytics =

Computer science journal

Int. J. Data Science and Analytics
- Discipline: Data science, statistics, machine Learning
- Language: English
- Edited by: João Gama

Publication details
- History: 2015–present
- Publisher: Springer Science+Business Media
- Frequency: 8/year
- Impact factor: 2.4 (2022)

Standard abbreviations
- ISO 4: Int. J. Data Sci. Anal.

Indexing
- ISSN: 2364-415X (print); 2364-4168 (web)
- LCCN: 2019204116
- OCLC no.: 1089114674

Links
- Journal homepage; Online archive

The International Journal of Data Science and Analytics is a peer-reviewed scientific journal covering data science. It was established in 2015 and is published by Springer Science+Business Media. The founding editor-in-chief is Longbing Cao (University of Technology Sydney). Current editor-in-chief is João Gama (INESC TEC and University of Porto).

== Abstracting and indexing ==
According to the Journal Citation Reports, the journal has a 2022 impact factor of 2.4. The journal is abstracted and indexed in:

- EI Compendex
- Emerging Sources Citation Index
- Inspec
- Scopus
