= Florian G. Kaiser =

- Born: August 27, 1959; Lohn-Ammannsegg, Solothurn, Switzerland
- Education: University of Zurich (diploma, and Dr. habil.); University of Bern (Ph.D.)
- Scientific career
- Fields: Environmental psychology
- Workplaces: Otto von Guericke University Magdeburg
- Thesis: Mobility as a Dwelling Problem: Place Attachment as Emotional Regulation (1996)
- Website: https://www.ipsy.ovgu.de/en/fgk.html

Florian G. Kaiser is a Swiss psychologist. From 2008 to 2025, he was professor of personality and social psychology at the Otto-von-Guericke University Magdeburg in Germany, serving as chair of its department of personality and social psychology. On October 2, 2025, he held his farewell lecture A View Beyond: Insights into the Unobservable.

== Education and career ==
From 1980 to 1986, Kaiser studied clinical psychology, biological-mathematical psychology, anthropological psychology, and psychopathology at the University of Zürich. In 1992, he earned his doctoral degree in psychology from the University of Bern. His doctoral thesis considered how individual behavior within their residence constituted a form of communication, such as through their material culture reflecting their preferences and emotional needs.

Kaiser completed his lecturer habilitation in 1999 at the University of Zürich. From 1994 to 1997, he worked at the University of California, Berkeley, and University of Trier as a postdoctoral research fellow. From 1998 to 2000, he was an assistant professor at the Swiss Federal Institute of Technology (ETH). From 2000 to 2008, he was an associate professor at Eindhoven University of Technology and senior lecturer at the University of Zürich.

== Research ==
Kaiser's research has focused on the Campbell paradigm, which theorizes that individuals decide whether to engage in environmentally protective behaviors based on a combination of the associated behavioral costs and their environmental attitudes. Building on earlier work by social scientist Donald T. Campbell, Kaiser has emphasized the importance of individual attitudes toward environmental stewardship as a motivator of behavior.

From 2017 to 2018, Kaiser served as co-chief editor of the Journal of Environmental Psychology.

== Honors and awards ==
In 2018, Kaiser was elected as a fellow of the International Association of Applied Psychology.

In 2021, Kaiser was invited for the keynote address (The C.F.-Graumann Lecture) at the 3rd International Conference on Environmental Psychology in Siracusa, Italy, entitled: Protecting the environment for its own sake against all odds.
