= Theory of reasoned action =

Psychological theory

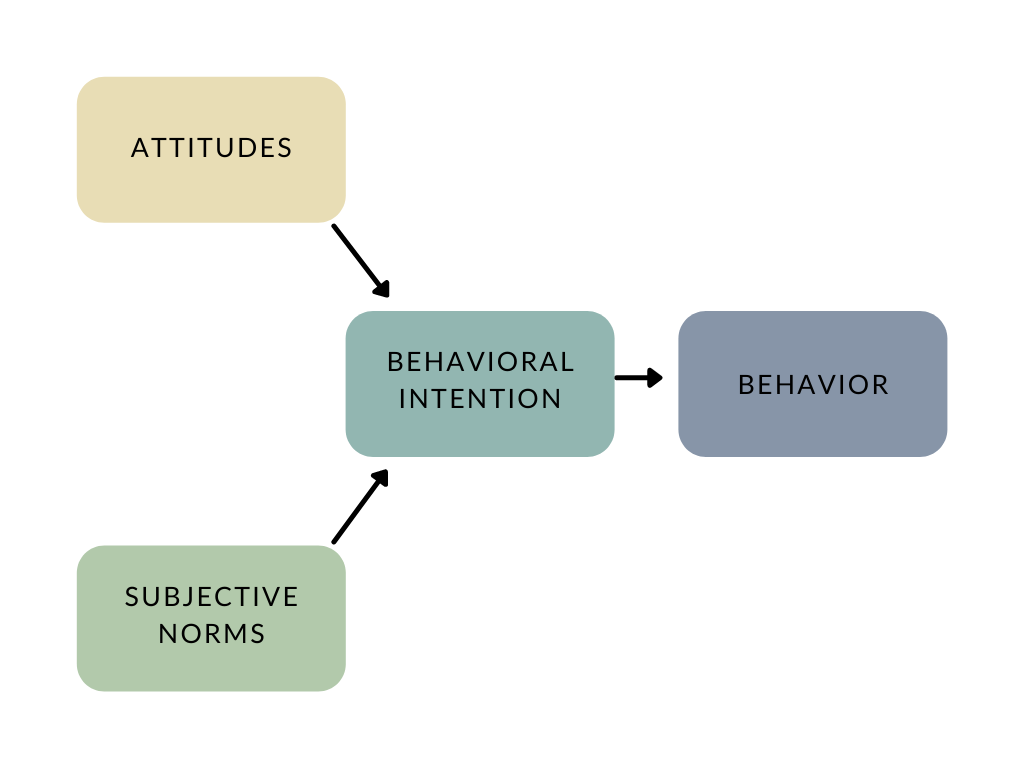
Theory of reasoned action, adapted from Fishbein and Ajzen

The theory of reasoned action (TRA or ToRA) aims to explain the relationship between attitudes and behaviors within human action. It is mainly used to predict how individuals will behave based on their pre-existing attitudes and behavioral intentions. An individual's decision to engage in a particular behavior is based on the outcomes the individual expects will come as a result of performing the behavior. Developed by Martin Fishbein and Icek Ajzen in 1967, the theory derived from previous research in social psychology, persuasion models, and attitude theories. Fishbein's theories suggested a relationship between attitude and behaviors (the A–B relationship). However, critics estimated that attitude theories were not proving to be good indicators of human behavior. The TRA was later revised and expanded by the two theorists in the following decades to overcome any discrepancies in the A–B relationship with the theory of planned behavior (TPB) and reasoned action approach (RAA). The theory is also used in communication discourse as a theory of understanding.

The primary purpose of the TRA is to understand an individual's voluntary behavior by examining the underlying basic motivation to perform an action. TRA states that a person's intention to perform a behavior is the main predictor of whether or not they actually perform that behavior. Additionally, the normative component (i.e. social norms surrounding the act) also contributes to whether or not the person will actually perform the behavior. According to the theory, intention to perform a certain behavior precedes the actual behavior. This intention is known as behavioral intention and comes as a result of a belief that performing the behavior will lead to a specific outcome. Behavioral intention is important to the theory because these intentions "are determined by attitudes to behaviors and subjective norms". TRA suggests that stronger intentions lead to increased effort to perform the behavior, which also increases the likelihood for the behavior to be performed.

== Key concepts and conditions ==
=== Behavior ===
A positivistic approach to behavior research, TRA attempts to predict and explain one's intention of performing a certain behavior. The theory requires that behavior be clearly defined in terms of the four following concepts: Action (e.g. to go, get), Target (e.g. a mammogram), Context (e.g. at the breast screening center), and Time (e.g. in the 12 months). According to TRA, behavioral intention is the main motivator of behavior, while the two key determinants on behavioral intention are people's attitudes and norms. By examining attitudes and subjective norms, researchers can gain an understanding as to whether or not one will perform the intended action.

=== Attitudes ===
According to TRA, attitudes are one of the key determinants of behavioral intention and refer to the way people feel towards a particular behavior. These attitudes are influenced by two factors: the strength of behavioral beliefs regarding the outcomes of the performed behavior (i.e. whether or not the outcome is probable) and the evaluation of the potential outcomes (i.e. whether or not the outcome is positive). Attitudes regarding a certain behavior can either be positive, negative or neutral. The theory stipulates that there exists a direct correlation between attitudes and outcomes, such that if one believes that a certain behavior will lead to a desirable or favorable outcome, then one is more likely to have a positive attitude towards the behavior. Alternatively, if one believes that a certain behavior will lead to an undesirable or unfavorable outcome, then one is more likely to have a negative attitude towards the behavior. and influence the decision of innovation adoption.

==== Behavioral belief ====
Behavioral belief allows us to understand people's motivations for their behavior in terms of the behavior's consequences. This concept stipulates that people tend to associate the performance of a certain behavior with a certain set of outcomes or features. For example, a person believes that if he or she studies for a month for his or her driver's license test, that one will pass the test after failing it the first time without studying at all. Here, the behavioral belief is that studying for a month is equated with success, whereas not studying at all is associated with failure.

==== Evaluation ====
The evaluation of the outcome refers to the way people perceive and evaluate the potential outcomes of a performed behavior. Such evaluations are conceived in a binary "good-bad" fashion-like manner. For example, a person may evaluate the outcome of quitting smoking cigarettes as positive if the behavioral belief is improved breathing and clean lungs. Conversely, a person may evaluate the outcome of quitting smoking cigarettes as negative if the behavioral belief is weight gain after smoking cessation.

=== Subjective norms ===
Subjective norms are also one of the key determinants of behavioral intention and refer to the way perceptions of relevant groups or individuals such as family members, friends, and peers may affect one's performance of the behavior. Ajzen defines subjective norms as the "perceived social pressure to perform or not perform the behavior". According to TRA, people develop certain beliefs or normative beliefs as to whether or not certain behaviors are acceptable. These beliefs shape one's perception of the behavior and determine one's intention to perform or not perform the behavior. For example, if one believes that recreational drug use (the behavior) is acceptable within one's social group, one will more likely be willing to engage in the activity. Alternatively, if one's friends groups perceive that the behavior is bad, one will be less likely to engage in recreational drug use. However, subjective norms also take into account people's motivation to comply with their social circle's views and perceptions, which vary depending on the situation and the individual's motivations.

==== Normative beliefs ====
Normative beliefs touch on whether or not referent groups approve of the action. There exists a direct correlation between normative beliefs and performance of the behavior. Usually, the more likely the referent groups will approve of the action, the more likely the individual will perform the act. Conversely, the less likely the referent groups will approve of the action, the less likely the individual will perform the act.

==== Motivation to comply ====
Motivation to comply addresses the fact that individuals may or may not comply with social norms of the referent groups surrounding the act. Depending on the individual's motivations in terms of adhering to social pressures, the individual will either succumb to the social pressures of performing the act if it is deemed acceptable, or alternatively will resist to the social pressures of performing the act if it is deemed unacceptable.

=== Behavioral intention ===
Behavioral intention is a function of both attitudes and subjective norms toward that behavior (also known as the normative component). Attitudes being how strongly one holds the attitude toward the act and subjective norms being the social norms associated with the act. The stronger the attitude and the more positive the subjective norm, the higher the A–B relationship should be. However, the attitudes and subjective norms are unlikely to be weighted equally in predicting behavior. Depending on the individual and situation, these factors might have different impacts on behavioral intention, thus a weight is associated with each of these factors. A few studies have shown that direct prior experience with a certain activity results in an increased weight on the attitude component of the behavioral intention function.

==== Formula ====
In its simplest form, the TRA can be expressed as the following equation:

$$BI {{=}} (AB)W_1 + (SN)W_2\,\!$$

where:

- BI = behavioral intention
- (AB) = one's attitude toward performing the behavior
- W = empirically derived weights
- SN = one's subjective norm related to performing the behavior

=== Conditions ===
The TRA theorists note that there are three conditions that can affect the relationship between behavioral intention and behavior. The first condition is that "the measure of intention must correspond with respect to their levels of specificity". This means that to predict a specific behavior, the behavioral intention must be equally specific. The second condition is that there must be "stability of intentions between time of measurement and performance of behavior". The intention must remain the same between the time that it is given and the time that the behavior is performed. The third condition is "the degree to which carrying out the intention is under the volitional control of the individual". The individual always has the control of whether or not to perform the behavior. These conditions have to do with the transition from verbal responses to actual behavior.

== Scope and limitations ==
=== Scope ===
While Fishbein and Ajzen developed the TRA within the field of health to understand health behaviors, the theorists asserted that TRA could be applied in any given context to understand and even predict any human behavior. According to Sheppard et al., behavioral intention can predict the performance of "any voluntary act, unless intent changes prior to the performance or unless the intention measure does not correspond to the behavioral criterion in terms of action, target, context, time-frame and/or specificity". Their statement asserts that according to TRA, the measure of behavioral intention can predict whether or not an individual will perform a certain act, as long as the behavioral intention remains the same and the behavior is clearly and properly defined. Broadening the scope of TRA, Sheppard conducted a study in which they applied TRA in situations that did not completely comply or conform with Fishbein and Ajzen's framework. Surveying 87 previous empirical studies, they applied the theory in contexts where the individual did not have full volitional control over the behavior and/or where individuals did not have all the information to develop the intention. To their surprise, they found that TRA could successfully be applied in situations that did not fully adhere to the three formal terms and conditions specified by the theory.

=== Limitations ===
Although the scope of TRA is wide, the theory still has its limitations and like any other theory, needs constant refinement and revision particularly when extending to choice and goals. The distinction between a goal intention and a behavioral intention concerns the capability to achieve one's intention, which involves multiple variables thus creating great uncertainty. Ajzen acknowledged that "some behaviors are more likely to present problems of controls than others, but we can never be absolutely certain that we will be in a position to carry out our intentions. Viewed in this light it becomes clear that strictly speaking every intention is a goal whose attainment is subject to some degree of uncertainty." TRA is designed to make broad generalizations, so there is no emphasis on specifics like personality, rules, or emotions. However, since the impact of these variables tends to balance out over larger populations, this approach helps ensure greater consistency and reliability in its findings.

According to Eagly and Chaiken, TRA does not take into account that certain conditions that enable the performance of a behavior are not available to individuals. Since the TRA focuses on behaviors that people decisively enact, the theory is limited in terms of being able to predict behaviors that require access to certain opportunities, skills, conditions, and/or resources. Additionally, certain intentions do not necessarily play a role in terms of connecting attitudes and behavior. According to a study conducted by Bagozzi and Yi, the performance of a behavior is not always preceded by a strong intent. In fact, attitudes and behaviors may not always be linked by intentions, particularly when the behavior does not require much cognitive effort.

== Development and investigation ==
In 1979, H. C. Triandis proposed expanding TRA to include more components. These factors were habit, facilitating conditions, and affect. When a person performs a behavior in a routine manner they form a habit. Facilitating conditions are conditions that make completion of an action more or less difficult. Both of these conditions affect their behavior directly. On the other hand, affect is the emotional response a person has towards a behavior and this emotional response only affects behavioral intention rather than directly affecting behavior. This expanded version of TRA has been used to study behaviors like women's participation in mammography procedures.

In 1985, Ajzen extended TRA to what he refers as the theory of planned behavior (TPB). This involves the addition of one major predictor—perceived behavioral control. This addition was introduced to account for times when people have the intention to conduct the behavior, but the actual behavior is thwarted because of subjective and objective reasons. In the theory of planned behavior, the attitude, subjective norms, and behavioral control have "important although differently weighted effects on a person's intention to behave".

In spite of the improvement, it is suggested that TRA and TPB only provides an account of the determinants of behavior when both motivation and opportunity to process information are high. Further research demonstrating the causal relationships among the variables in TPB and any expansions of it is clearly necessary. The model also mentions little about the memory process.

== Applications ==
TRA has been used in many studies as a framework for examining specific kinds of behavior such as communication behavior, consumer behavior and health behavior. Many researchers use the theory to study behaviors that are associated with high risks and danger like unethical conduct, as well as deviant behavior. In contrast, some research has applied the theory to more normative and rational types of action like voting behavior. Researchers Davies, Foxall, and Pallister suggest that TRA can be tested if "behavior is measured objectively without drawing a connection to prior intention". Most studies, however, look at intention because of its central role in the theory.

=== Communication ===
==== College fraternity and sorority hazing ====
TRA has been applied to the study of whistle-blowing intentions and hazing in college organizations, specifically fraternities and sororities. Richardson et al. set out to study whistle-blowing by using TRA as a framework to predict whether or not individuals will come forward about report hazing incidents. Their study served to examine whether the relationships suggested by the TRA model remain true in predicting whistle blowing intentions, and if these relationships would change depending on the severity of the hazing incident.

Richardson et al. surveyed a sample of 259 students from Greek organizations at university in the Southwestern United States. The survey questions measured the different aspects of the TRA model: behavioral beliefs, outcome evaluations, attitude toward the behavior, normative beliefs, motivation to comply, subjective norms, and the consequence endogenous variable. The questions asked respondents to rate their responses on various 7 point scales. "Participants in the study responded to one of three scenarios, varying in level of severity, describing a hazing situation occurring in their fraternity or sorority". In line with the theory, the researchers wanted to identify if attitudes held about hazing, dangerous activity, and group affiliation, along with subjective norms about whistle-blowing (reactions by others, consequences of reporting the action, isolation from the group) would influence whether or not an individual would go through with reporting a hazing incident. The results of the study found that individuals were more likely to report, or whistle-blow, on hazing incidents that were more severe or harmful to individuals. Simultaneously, individuals were also concerned about the perceptions of others' attitudes towards them and the consequences they may face if they reported hazing incidents.

==== Public relations and marketing ====
TRA can be applied to the field of public relations and marketing by applying the basics of the theory to campaigns. A few examples of this is using it in a hotel marketing strategy and how likely customers are to come back to the hotel based on behaviors. Brands and companies can use this theory to see what consumers are going to buy and how to create materials for campaigns based on this information. Other researchers investigated the consumers' motivation and extended TRA model.

==== Knowledge sharing in companies ====
TRA is used to examine the communication behavior in corporations. One of the behaviors TRA helped characterize is knowledge sharing (KS) in companies. In the study conducted by Ho, Hsu, and Oh, they proposed two models to construct KS process by introducing TRA and game theory (GT). One model captures personal psychological feelings (attitudes and subjective norms), the other model not only captures personal feelings but also takes other people's decisions into consideration. By comparing the two models, researchers found that the model based on TRA has a higher predictive accuracy than the model based on TRA and GT. They concluded that employees "have a high probability of not analyzing the decisions of others", and whether taking other colleague's decision into account has a great impact on people's KS behavioral intention. It is indicated that "the more indirect decision-makers there are in organizations, the less effective is KS". To encourage KS, company managers should avoid including indirect decision-makers in the projects.

=== Consumer behavior ===
==== Coupon usage ====
Coupon usage has also been studied through TRA framework by researchers interested in consumer and marketer behavior. In 1984, Terence Shimp and Alican Kavas applied this theory to coupon usage behavior, with the research premise that "coupon usage is rational, systematic, and thoughtful behavior" in contrast with other applications of the theory to more dangerous types of behavior.

TRA serves as a useful model because it can help examine whether "consumers' intentions to use coupons are determined by their attitudes and perceptions of whether important others think one should or should not expend the effort to clip, save, and use coupons". The consumer's behavior intentions are influenced by their personal beliefs about coupon usage, meaning whether or not they think saving money is important and are willing to spend the time clipping coupons. These potential beliefs also influenced the coupon user's thoughts about what others think about their usage of coupons. Together, the coupon user will use their own beliefs and the opinions of others to form an overall attitude towards coupon usage. To approach this study, Shimp and Alican surveyed 770 households and measured the aspects of the TRA model in terms of the participant's responses. The received responses indicated that consumers' norms are "partially determined by their personal beliefs toward coupon usage, and to an even greater extend, that attitudes are influenced by internalizations of others' beliefs". Positive attitudes towards this behavior are influenced by an individual's perceptions that their partners will be satisfied by their time spent and efforts made to save money.

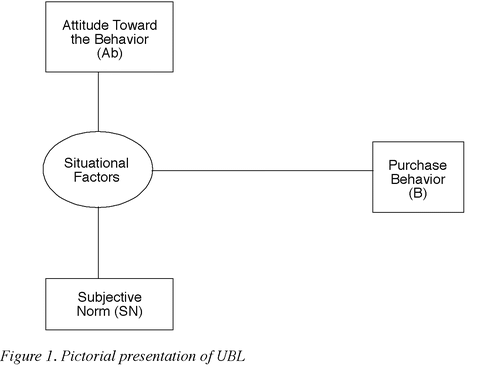
3 variables in Unit Brand Loyalty (UBL)

==== Brand loyalty ====
TRA has been applied to redefine brand loyalty. According to TRA, the antecedents of purchase behavior are attitudes towards the purchase and subjective norm. In 1998, Ha conducted a study to investigate the relationships among several antecedents of unit brand loyalty (UBL) by introducing TRA. Consumers are brand loyal when both attitude and behavior are favorable. In his study, Ha developed a table indicating 8 combinations of customers' brand loyalty based on their loyalty on 3 variables – attitude towards the behavior, subjective norm, and purchase behavior is loyal. According to Ha, marketing managers should not be discouraged by a temporary disloyalty and need to strive for grabbing brand loyalty when customers are showing loyalty to two of the three variables, but they need to rediagnose their customers' brand loyalty when customers are showing loyalty to only one of them. The main focus should be pointed at either enhancing the consumer's attitude toward their brand or adjusting their brand to the social norms. New research investigated norms in social media, contributing to TRA from a more updating perspective.

==== Green Behaviors ====
TRA has also been used to study consumer attitudes towards renewable energy. In 2000, Bang, et al. found that people who cared about environmental issues like pollution were more willing to spend more for renewable energy. Similarly, a 2008 study of Swedish consumers by Hansla et al. showed that those who with a positive view of renewable energy were more willing to spend money on sustainable energy for their homes. These studies are evidence that the emotional response people have towards a topic affects their attitude, which in turn affects their behavioral intent. These studies also provide examples for how the TRA is used to market goods that might not make the most sense from a strictly economic perspective. Gotch and Hall examined children's nature-related behaviors through TRA approach.

In addition, Mishara et al.'s research proved there is a positively relation between behavioral intention and actual behavior in green information technology (GIT) acceptance. Those professionals with positive intentions towards GIT tend to exploit GIT into practice.

==== Generation Z ====
More recently, Gen Z has been studied using TRA to identify their shopping behaviors and purchasing intentions with products. With the increase in online exposure that Gen Z has, many studies have focused on how this influences their intentions, as well as how their awareness towards ethical dilemmas influence their decision making. In 2022, Djafarova and Foots found that Gen Z is highly aware of not only ethical issues, but environmental ones as well, due to their exposure to media. Additionally, they found that this influences their consumption behavior despite their financial standings. In 2019, Copeland and Zhao suggested that the social influence of peers on social networking systems, such as Instagram, should be added to the TRA as well, due to its influence on purchasing intentions. Since Gen Z are the main contributors and consumers of social networks such as Instagram, it goes to show how it impacts their intentions when purchasing products. Similar research looks into how Gen Z's intentions are influenced not only by their ethical assumptions, and social media exposure, but also how the sites they shop on are designed. In 2023, Ryu et al. discovered that Gen Z prefer omnichannel shopping, and when companies provide smooth and uninterrupted shopping experiences, Gen Z are more inclined to purchase those products.

=== Health behavior ===
==== Condom use ====
TRA has been frequently used as a framework and predictive mechanism of applied research on sexual behavior, especially in prevention of sexually transmitted disease such as HIV. In 2001, Albarracín, Johnson, Fishbein, and Muellerleile applied theory of reasoned action (TRA) and theory of planned behavior (TPB) into studying how well the theories predict condom use. To be consistent with TRA, the authors synthesized 96 data sets (N = 22,594), and associate every component in condom use with certain weight. Their study indicates that TRA and TPB are highly successful predictors of condom use. According to their discussion, "people are more likely to use condoms if they have previously formed the corresponding intentions. These intentions to use condoms appear to derive from attitudes, subjective norms, and perceived behavioral control. These attitudes and norms, in turn, appear to derive from outcome and normative beliefs. Nevertheless, whether behavior was assessed retrospectively or prospectively was an important moderator that influenced the magnitude of the associations between theoretically important variables."

==== Sexual behavior in teenage girls ====
In 2011, W.M. Doswell, Braxter, Cha, and Kim examined sexual behavior in African American teenage girls and applied the theory as a framework for understanding this behavior. TRA can explain these behaviors in that teens' behavioral intentions to engage in early sexual behavior are influenced by their pre-existing attitudes and subjective norms of their peers. Attitudes in this context are favorable or unfavorable dispositions towards teenage sexual behavior. Subjective norms are the perceived social pressure teenagers feel from their friends, classmates, and other peer groups to engage in sexual behavior. As a framework, the TRA suggests that adolescents will participate in early behavior because of their own attitudes towards the behavior and the subjective norms of their peers. In this case, intention is the willful plan to perform early sexual behavior. Findings from the student showed that the TRA was supportive in predicting early sexual behavior among African American teenage girls. Attitudes towards sex and subjective norms both correlated with intentions to participate in early sexual behavior in the study's sample.

==== Pediatricians, parents and HPV vaccinations ====
A 2011 study examining pediatricians' behaviors surrounding the human papillomavirus (HPV) vaccine found that TRA predicted the pediatricians would encourage parents to get their daughters vaccinated. Roberto, Krieger, Katz, Goei, and Jain discovered that the norms surrounding this topic were more important in predicting behavior than perceived behavioral control.

==== Exercise ====
The public health community, interested in reducing rising obesity rates, has used TRA to study people's exercise behavior. A 1981 study by Bentler and Speckart revealed that intent to exercise was determined by a person's attitude toward exercise, as predicted by TRA. In a broader literature review on the study of exercise using TRA and TPB, it was determined that behavioral intent to exercise is better framed by TRA than TPB because perceived behavioral control did not have a significant effect on the intent to exercise.

== Critiques ==
=== Challenges ===
According to Fishbein's and Ajzen's original (1967) formulation of TRA, a behavioral intention measure will predict the performance of any voluntary act, unless intent changes prior to performance or unless the intention measure does not correspond to the behavioral criterion in terms of action, target, context, time-frame and/or specificity. The model of TRA has been challenged by studies determined to examine its limitation and inadequacy.

The major problem of TRA is pointed out to be the ignorance of the connections between individuals, both the interpersonal and social relations in which they act, and the broader social structures which govern social practice. Although TRA recognizes the importance of social norms, strategies are limited to a consideration of individual perceptions of these social phenomena. An individual's belief, attitudes and understandings are constituted activity; therefore the distinction of the two factors is ambiguous. In 1972, Schwartz and Tessler noted that there are other major and subjective determinants of intentions at play that go beyond attitudes toward the behavior and subjective norms. Namely, they propose that one's sense of right and wrongs, as well as one's beliefs surrounding moral obligation may also impact one's intention. This value system is internalized independently from Fishbein and Ajzen's subjective norms. Furthermore, social change may be generational rather than the sum of individual change. TRA fails to capture and oversimplifies the social processes of change and the social nature of the change itself: a model in which people collectively appropriate and construct new meanings and practice.

Additionally, the habituation of past behavior also tends to reduce the impact that intention has on behavior as the habit increases. Gradually, the performance of the behavior become less of a rational, initiative behavior and more of a learned response. In addition, intention appears to have a direct effect on behavior in the short term only. Besides, the analysis of the conceptual basis also raises concerns. It is criticized that the model does not enable the generation of hypothesis because of their ambiguity. The model focuses on analytic truth rather than synthetic one, therefore the conclusions resulting from those applications are often true by definition rather than by observation which makes the model unfalsifiable. The strengths of attitudes toward a behavior (social/personal) and subjective norms also vary cross-culturally while the process by which the behavior engaged remains the same. An example of this is shown in a cross-cultural study on fast food choices, where people from Western cultures were found to be more influenced by their prior choice of restaurant than people from Eastern cultures. This would suggest that people from different cultures weight subjective norms and existing attitudes differently. A closer examination of the cross-cultural communication process will benefit and complete the understanding of TRA.

=== Future directions ===
According to Jaccard James, three directions are waiting for further research in TRA. The first one is per-individual level. The second area is a split-second situations, namely, instant decision-making. The third one is multioption contexts. In other words, how people perform when facing multiple alternatives should be stressed in the future study.

== See also ==
- Behavioural change theories (overview article)
- Reasoned action approach (the last revision of the theory)
- Technology acceptance model
- Theory of planned behavior
- The other two classic models of persuasion: 1) Cognitive dissonance 2) Social judgment theory
