= Behavior =

Actions by entities within a system

Behavior (American English) or behaviour (British English) is the range of actions of organisms, individuals, systems or artificial entities in some environment. These systems can include other systems or organisms as well as the inanimate physical environment. It is the computed response of the system or organism to various stimuli or inputs, whether internal or external, conscious or subconscious, overt or covert, and voluntary or involuntary. While some behavior is produced in response to an organism's environment (extrinsic motivation), behavior can also be the product of intrinsic motivation, also referred to as "agency" or "free will".

Taking a behavior informatics perspective, a behavior consists of actor, operation, interactions, and their properties. This can be represented as a behavior vector.

== Models ==
=== Biology ===
==== Definition ====
A broader definition of behavior, applicable to plants and other organisms, is similar to the concept of phenotypic plasticity. It describes behavior as a response to an event or environment change during the course of the lifetime of an individual, differing from other physiological or biochemical changes that occur more rapidly, and excluding changes that are a result of development (ontogeny).

Behaviour can be regarded as any action of an organism that changes its relationship to its environment. Behavior provides outputs from the organism to the environment.

==== Determination by genetics or the environment ====
Behaviors can be either innate or learned from the environment, or both, dependent on the organism. The more complex nervous systems (or brains) are, the more influence learning has on behavior. However, even in mammals, a large fraction of behavior is genetically determined. For instance, prairie voles tend to be monogamous, while meadow voles are more promiscuous, a difference that is strongly determined by a single gene, Avpr1a, encoding a receptor for the peptide hormone Vasopressin.

=== Human behavior ===
The endocrine system and the nervous system likely influence human behavior. Complexity in the behavior of an organism may be correlated to the complexity of its nervous system. Generally, organisms with more complex nervous systems have a greater capacity to learn new responses and thus adjust their behavior.

Consumer behaviour is the behavior of humans when they act or treated as consumers.

=== Animal behavior ===
Ethology is the scientific and objective study of animal behavior, usually with a focus on behavior under natural conditions, and viewing behavior as an evolutionarily adaptive trait. Behaviorism is a term that also describes the scientific and objective study of animal behavior, usually referring to measured responses to stimuli or trained behavioral responses in a laboratory context, without a particular emphasis on evolutionary adaptivity.

== In management ==
=== Organizational ===
In management, behaviors are associated with desired or undesired focuses. Managers generally note what the desired outcome is, but behavioral patterns can take over. These patterns are the reference to how often the desired behavior actually occurs. Before a behavior actually occurs, antecedents focus on the stimuli that influence the behavior that is about to happen. Eventually, consequences consisting of rewards or punishments ensue.

=== Social behavior ===
Social behavior is behavior among two or more organisms within the same species, and encompasses any behavior in which one member affects the other. This is due to an interaction among those members. Social behavior can be seen as similar to an exchange of goods, with the expectation that when one gives, one will receive the same. This behavior can be affected by both the qualities of the individual and the environmental (situational) factors. Therefore, social behavior arises as a result of an interaction between the two—the organism and its environment. This means that, in regards to humans, social behavior can be determined by both the individual characteristics of the person, and the situation they are in.

== Behavior informatics ==
Behavior informatics, also called behavior computing, explores behavior intelligence and behavior insights from the informatics and computing perspectives.

Different from applied behavior analysis from the psychological perspective, behavior informatics builds computational theories, systems and tools to qualitatively and quantitatively model, represent, analyze, and manage behaviors of individuals, groups and/or organizations.

== Health ==
Health behavior refers to a person's beliefs and actions regarding their health and well-being. Health behaviors are direct factors in maintaining a healthy lifestyle. Health behaviors are influenced by the social, cultural, and physical environments in which we live. They are shaped by individual choices and external constraints. Positive behaviors help promote health and prevent disease, while the opposite is true for risk behaviors. Health behaviors are early indicators of population health. Because of the time lag that often occurs between certain behaviors and the development of disease, these indicators may foreshadow the future burdens and benefits of health-risk and health-promoting behaviors.

=== Correlates ===
A variety of studies have examined the relationship between health behaviors and health outcomes and have demonstrated their role in both morbidity and mortality. These studies have identified seven features of lifestyle which were associated with lower morbidity and higher subsequent long-term survival:

- Avoiding snacks
- Eating breakfast regularly
- Exercising regularly
- Maintaining a desirable body weight
- Moderate alcohol intake
- Not smoking
- Sleeping 7–8hrs per night

Health behaviors impact upon individuals' quality of life, by delaying the onset of chronic disease and extending active lifespan. Smoking, alcohol consumption, drug use, diet, gaps in primary care services and low screening uptake are all significant determinants of poor health, and changing such behaviors should lead to improved health. For example, in US, Healthy People 2000, United States Department of Health and Human Services, lists increased physical activity, changes in nutrition and reductions in tobacco, alcohol and drug use as important for health promotion and disease prevention.

=== Treatment approach ===
Any interventions done are matched with the needs of each individual in an ethical and respected manner. Health belief model encourages increasing individuals' perceived susceptibility to negative health outcomes and making individuals aware of the severity of such negative health behavior outcomes. E.g. through health promotion messages. In addition, the health belief model suggests the need to focus on the benefits of health behaviors and the fact that barriers to action are easily overcome. The theory of planned behavior suggests using persuasive messages for tackling behavioral beliefs to increase the readiness to perform a behavior, called intentions. The theory of planned behavior advocates the need to tackle normative beliefs and control beliefs in any attempt to change behavior. Challenging the normative beliefs is not enough but to follow through the intention with self-efficacy from individual's mastery in problem solving and task completion is important to bring about a positive change. Self efficacy is often cemented through standard persuasive techniques.

== See also ==
- Applied behavior analysis
- Behavioral cusp
- Behavioral economics
- Behavioral genetics
- Behavioral sciences
- Cognitive bias
- Evolutionary physiology
- Experimental analysis of behavior
- Human sexual behavior
- Herd behavior
- Instinct
- Mere-measurement effect
- Motivation
- Normality (behavior)
- Organizational studies
- Radical behaviorism
- Reasoning
- Rebellion
- Social relation
- Theories of political behavior
- Work behavior
