= Martin Fishbein =

Social psychologist (1936–2009)

Martin Fishbein (March 2, 1936 Brooklyn, New York – November 27, 2009 London) was a social psychologist, considered influential, and active AIDS prevention. He had been director of the health communication program at the University of Pennsylvania Public Policy Center of the Annenberg School for Communication.

== Biography ==
Raised in Jamaica, Queens, Fishbein earned a bachelor's degree from Reed College and a doctorate in psychology from the University of California, Los Angeles before he joined the University of Illinois faculty in 1961.

Fishbein is considered to have pioneered the reasoned action approach which “has emerged as the dominant conceptual framework for predicting, explaining, and changing human social behavior.”

== Career ==
While at the University of Illinois in 1975, he and Icek Ajzen coauthored Belief, Attitude, Intention and Behavior. He went on to be a consultant at the National Institute of Mental Health in the 1980s about AIDS and was a guest AIDS researcher at the Centers for Disease Control and Prevention from 1992 until 1996.
