= Theory of planned behavior =

Theory that links behavior and beliefs

The theory of planned behavior.

The theory of planned behavior (TPB) is a psychological theory that links beliefs to behavior. The theory maintains that three core components, namely, attitude, subjective norms, and perceived behavioral control, together shape an individual's behavioral intentions. In turn, a tenet of TPB is that behavioral intention is the most proximal determinant of human social behavior.

The theory was elaborated by Icek Ajzen with the purpose of improving the predictive power of the theory of reasoned action (TRA). Ajzen's idea was to include perceived behavioral control in Theory of Planned Behavior (TPB). Perceived behavior control was not a component of theory of reasoned action (TRA). Theory of Planned Behavior (TPB) has been applied to studies of the relations among beliefs, attitudes, behavioral intentions, and behaviors in various human domains. These domains include, but are not limited to, advertising, public relations, advertising campaigns, healthcare, sport management consumer/household finance, and sustainability.

== History ==
=== Extension from the theory of reasoned action ===
Icek Ajzen (1985) proposed Theory of Planned Behavior (TPB) in his chapter "From intentions to actions: A theory of planned behavior." Theory of Planned Behavior (TPB) developed out of Theory of Reasoned Action (TRA), a theory first proposed in 1980 by Martin Fishbein and Ajzen. Theory of Reasoned Action (TRA) was in turn grounded in various theories bearing on attitude and attitude change, including learning theories, expectancy-value theories, attribution theory, and consistency theories (e.g., Heider's balance theory, Osgood and Tannenbaum's congruity theory, and Festinger's dissonance theory). According to Theory of Reasoned Action (TRA) , if an individual evaluates a suggested behavior as positive (attitude), and if he or she believes significant others want the person to perform the behavior (subjective norm), the intention (motivation) to perform the behavior will be greater and the individual will be more likely to perform the behavior. Attitudes and subjective norms are highly correlated with behavioral intention; behavioral intention is correlated with actual behavior.

Research, however, shows that behavioral intention does not always lead to actual behavior. Because behavioral intention cannot be the exclusive determinant of behavior where an individual's control over the behavior is incomplete, Ajzen introduced Theory of Planned Behavior (TPB) by adding to Theory of Reasoned Action (TRA) the component "perceived behavioral control". In this way he extended Theory of Reasoned Action (TRA) to better predict actual behavior.

Perceived behavioral control refers to the degree to which a person believes that he or she can perform a given behavior. Perceived behavioral control involves the perception of the individual's own ability to perform the behavior. In other words, perceived behavioral control is behavior- or goal-specific. That perception varies by environmental circumstances and the behavior involved. The theory of planned behavior suggests that people are much more likely to intend to enact certain behaviors when they feel that they can enact them successfully.

The theory has thus improved upon TRA.

=== Extension of self-efficacy ===
Along with attitudes and subjective norms (which make up Theory of Reasoned Action (TRA)), Theory of Planned Behavior (TPB) adds the concept of perceived behavioral control, which grew out of self-efficacy theory (SET). Bandura proposed self-efficacy construct in 1977, in connection to social cognitive theory. Self-efficacy refers to a person's expectation or confidence that he or she can master a behavior or accomplish a goal; an individual has different levels of self-efficacy depending on the behavior or intent. Bandura distinguished two distinct types of goal-related expectations: self-efficacy and outcome expectancy. He defined self-efficacy as the conviction that one can successfully execute the behavior required to produce the outcome in question. Outcome expectancy refers to a person's estimation that a given behavior will lead to certain outcomes. Bandura advanced the view that self-efficacy is the most important precondition for behavioral change, since it is key to the initiation of coping behavior.

Previous investigations have shown that a person's behavior is strongly influenced by the individual's confidence in his or her ability to perform that behavior. As self-efficacy contributes to explanations of various relationships among beliefs, attitudes, intentions, and behavior, Theory of Planned Behavior (TPB) has been widely applied in health-related fields such as helping preadolescents to engage in more physical activity, thereby improving their mental health, and getting adults to exercise more.

== Key concepts ==
=== Normative beliefs and subjective norms ===
- Normative belief: an individual's perception of social normative pressures, or the beliefs of relevant others bearing on what behaviors should or should not be performed.
- Subjective norm: an individual's perception about the particular behavior, which is influenced by the judgment of significant others (e.g., parents, spouse, friends, teachers).

=== Control beliefs and perceived behavioral control ===
- Control beliefs: an individual's beliefs about the presence of factors that may facilitate or hinder performance of the behavior.
- Perceived behavioral control: an individual's perceived ease or difficulty of performing the particular behavior. The concept of perceived behavioral control is conceptually related to self-efficacy. It is assumed that perceived behavioral control is determined by the total set of accessible control beliefs.

=== Behavioral intention and behavior ===
- Behavioral intention: an individual's readiness to perform a given behavior. It is assumed to be an immediate antecedent of behavior. It is based on attitude toward the behavior, subjective norm, and perceived behavioral control, with each predictor weighted for its importance in relation to the behavior and population of interest.
- Behavior: an individual's observable response in a given situation with respect to a given target. Ajzen advanced the view that a behavior is a function of compatible intentions and perceptions of behavioral control. Perceived behavioral control is expected to moderate the effect of intention on behavior, such that a favorable intention produces the behavior only when perceived behavioral control is strong.

== Conceptual / operational comparison ==
=== Perceived behavioral control vs. self-efficacy ===
Ajzen (1991) wrote that the role of perceived behavioral control in the theory of planned behavior derived from Bandura's concept of self-efficacy. More recently, Fishbein and Cappella advanced the view that self-efficacy is equivalent to perceived behavioral control in Ajzen's integrative model. Perceived behavioral control can be assessed with the help of items from a self-efficacy scale.

In previous studies, the construction of measures of perceived behavioral control has had to be tailored to each particular health-related behavior. For example, for smoking, an item could read "I don't think I am addicted because I can really just not smoke and not crave for it" or "It would be really easy for me to quit."

The concept of self-efficacy is rooted in Bandura's social cognitive theory. It refers to the conviction that one can successfully execute the behavior required to attain a desired goal. The concept of self-efficacy is used as perceived behavioral control, which means the perception of the ease or difficulty of the particular behavior. It is linked to control beliefs, which refer to beliefs about the presence of factors that may facilitate or impede performance of the behavior.

Perceived behavioral control is usually measured with self-report instruments comprising items that begin with the stem, "I am sure I can ... (e.g., exercise, quit smoking, etc.)." Such instruments attempt to measure the individual's confidence that he or she can execute a given behavior.

=== Attitude toward behavior vs. outcome expectancy ===
The theory of planned behavior specifies the nature of the relationship between beliefs and attitudes. According to the theory, an individual's evaluation of, or attitude toward, a behavior is determined by his or her accessible beliefs about the behavior. The term belief in this theory refers to the subjective probability that the behavior will produce a certain outcome. Specifically, the evaluation of each outcome contributes to the attitude commensurately with the person's subjective probability that the behavior produces the outcome in question. A belief is accessible if available from long-term memory.

The concept of outcome expectancy originated in the expectancy-value model. Outcome expectancy can be a belief, attitude, opinion, or expectation. According to the theory of planned behavior, an individual's positive evaluation of his or her performance of a particular behavior is similar to the concept of perceived benefits. A positive evaluation refers to a belief regarding the effectiveness of the proposed behavior in reducing the vulnerability to negative outcomes. By contrast, a negative self-evaluation refers to a belief regarding adverse consequences that can result from the enactment of the behavior.

=== Social influence ===
The concept of social influence has been assessed in both the theory of reasoned action and theory of planned behavior. Individuals' elaborative thoughts on subjective norms are perceptions of whether they are expected by their friends, their family, and society in general to perform a particular behavior. Social influence is measured by evaluating the attitudes of social groups. For example, in the case of smoking:

1. Subjective norms the individual attaches to the peer group include thoughts such as, "Most of my friends smoke" or "I feel ashamed of smoking in front of a group of friends who don't smoke";
2. Subjective norms the individual attaches to the family include thoughts such as, "All of my family smokes, and it seems natural to start smoking" or "My parents were really mad at me when I started smoking"; and
3. Subjective norms the individual attaches to society or the general culture include thoughts such as, "Everyone is against smoking" or "We just assume everyone is a nonsmoker."

While most models are conceptualized within individual cognitive space, the theory of planned behavior considers social influence in terms of social norms and normative beliefs. Given that an individual's behavior (e.g., health-related decision-making such as diet, condom use, quitting smoking, and drinking) might very well be located in and dependent on social networks and organizations (e.g., peer group, family, school, and workplace), social influence has been a welcomed addition to the theory.

== Model ==
Human behavior is guided by three kinds of considerations: behavioral beliefs, normative beliefs, and control beliefs. In their respective aggregates, behavioral beliefs produce a favorable or unfavorable attitude toward the behavior, normative beliefs result in a subjective norm, and control beliefs pertain to perceived behavioral control.

In combination, the attitude toward the behavior, the subjective norm, and the perceived behavioral control lead to the formation of a behavioral intention. In particular, perceived behavioral control is presumed not only to affect actual behavior directly, but also to affect it indirectly through behavioral intention.

As a general rule, when (a) the individual has a favorable attitude toward a behavior, (b) the attitude is aligned with the relevant norms, and (c) the individual perceives that they have a high level of behavioral control, a strong intention to perform the behavior in question is expected. Finally, given a sufficient degree of actual control over the behavior, the individual is expected to carry out their intentions when the opportunity arises.

== Formula ==
In a simple form, behavioral intention for the theory of planned behavior can be expressed as the following mathematical function:

$$BI = w_A A + w_{SN} SN + w_{PBC} PBC$$

The three factors being proportional to their underlying beliefs:

$$\begin{align}
A &\propto \sum_{i=1}^n b_i e_i \\
SN &\propto \sum_{i=1}^n n_i m_i \\
PBC &\propto \sum_{i=1}^n c_i p_i
\end{align}$$

BI: Behavioral intention

A: Attitude toward behavior

b: the strength of each belief concerning an outcome or attribute

e: the evaluation of the outcome or attribute

SN: Subjective norm

n: the strength of each normative belief of each referent

m: the motivation to comply with the referent

PBC: Perceived Behavioral Control

c: the strength of each control belief

p: the perceived power of the control factor

w : empirically derived weight/coefficient

To the extent that it is an accurate reflection of actual behavioral control, perceived behavioral control can, together with intention, be used to predict behavior.

$$B = w_{BI}BI + w_{PBC}PBC$$

B: Behavior

BI: Behavioral intention

PBC: Perceived Behavioral Control

w : empirically derived weight/coefficient

== Applications of the theory ==
The theory of planned behavior has been applied to a number of research areas including health-related behaviors, environmental psychology, and voting behavior.

=== Health-related behaviors ===
Several studies found that, compared to Theory of Reasoned Action (TRA), Theory of Planned Behavior (TPB) better predicts health-related behavioral intention. Theory of Planned Behavior (TPB) has improved the predictability of intention with regard to several health-related behaviors, including condom use, choice of leisure activities, exercise, and diet. In this research, attitudes and intentions tend to be mediated by goals and needs. For example, an individual may be guided by the goal of losing 5 kg of weight in 60 days; a positive attitude and intention towards dieting would be important. However, if a need is taken into account, such as a need for a partner in an individual's effort to lose weight and the person is unable to find such a partner, the individual is not likely to lose weight.

Theory of Planned Behavior (TPB) can also be applied to the area of nutrition-related interventions. In a study by Sweitzer et al., Theory of Planned Behavior (TPB)-related behavioral constructs guided the development of intervention strategies. Theory of Planned Behavior (TPB) was applied in such a way as to encourage parents to include more fruit, vegetables and whole grains in the lunches they packed for their preschool children. Knowledge/behavioral control, self-efficacy/perceived behavioral control, subjective norms, and intentions were assessed. The researchers observed in the Theory of Planned Behavior (TPB)-oriented intervention a significant increase in vegetables and whole grains in the lunches parents prepared for their children.

Theory of Planned Behavior (TPB) has guided research aimed at preventing weight regain in individuals who had recently experienced a significant weight loss. McConnon et al. (2012) found that perceived need to control weight predicts the behavior needed for weight maintenance. Theory of Planned Behavior (TPB) can also help in assessing the behavioral intentions of practitioners who promote specific health behaviors. Chase et al. (2003) studied dietitians' intentions to promote the consumption of whole grain foods. The study team found that the strongest indicator of dietitians' intentions to promote the consumption of whole grain foods was their normative beliefs about diet. However, some dietitians' knowledge was problematic, with only 60% of dietitians being able to correctly identify a whole grain product from a food label.

More recent research based on Theory of Planned Behavior (TPB) examined college students' intentions to smoke e-cigarettes. Studies found that attitudes toward smoking and social norms significantly predicted college students' behavior, as Theory of Planned Behavior (TPB) suggests. Positive attitudes toward smoking and normalizing the behavior were, in part, helped by advertisements on the Internet. With this knowledge, a smoking prevention campaign was started, specifically targeting college students collectively, not just as individuals.

The theory of planned behavior model has thus been helpful in understanding health-related behaviors and developing interventions aimed at modifying those behaviors.

=== Environmental psychology ===
Another application of Theory of Planned Behavior (TPB) has been in the field of environmental psychology. Generally speaking, actions that are environmentally friendly carry a positive normative belief. That is to say, behaviors that are consistent with environmental sustainability are widely promoted as positive behaviors. However, although there may be a behavioral intention to practice such behaviors, constraints can impede a sense of perceived behavioral control. An example of such a constraint is the belief that one's behavior will not have an impact. There are external constraints as well. For example, if an individual intends to behave in an environmentally responsible way but recycling infrastructure is absent in the individual's community, perceived behavioral control is likely to be low. The application of Theory of Planned Behavior (TPB) in these situations helps explain contradictions such as individuals having positive attitudes toward sustainability but engaging in behavior that is antithetical to the idea of sustainability.

Other research has found that attitudes toward climate change, perceived behavioral control, and subjective norms are associated with the intention to adopt a pro-environmental behavior. This knowledge can be applied to policy-making aimed at increasing environmentally friendly behavior.

Additionally, research has been done more recently on Gen Z and how they relate to environmental psychology through the use of the Theory of Planned Behavior (TPB). For example, in 2020, Chaturvedi et al. conducted research on the behavioral intentions of Gen Z when it came to recycled clothing. They found that environmental concern, perceived value, and willingness to pay were the top leading factors in their purchasing intentions. Similarly, Noor et al., looked at the actions surrounding green purchases and activities amongst Gen Z in 2017. They found that Gen Z has the intention of consuming green products due to the positive associations aligned with it, along with the subjective norms, perceived green knowledge, and social visibility towards those purchases. Outside of personal product consumption, Ngo and Ha looked at Gen Z on using green tourism in 2023. They found that Gen Z used knowledge sharing as a precursor to shape their perception and attitudes towards green tourism services. Moreover, they recognized the importance of knowledge sharing to raise awareness surrounding not only green tourism, but green practices all together, to induce positive attitudes about sustainable practices.

=== Voting behavior ===
Theory of Planned Behavior (TPB) has guided political scientists' research on voter turnout and behavior. TPB has also been applied to help us understand legislator behavior.

=== Financial behavior ===
The theory of planned behavior (TPB) is widely utilized in the field of household financial behavior research. This theory helps to understand and predict various financial decisions and behaviors, including investment choices, debt management, mortgage use, cash, saving, and credit management. It posits that individual intentions and attitudes, subjective norms, and perceived behavioral control are key factors influencing behavior. Over the years, researchers have applied and expanded upon this theory to gain insights into specific financial behaviors and their determinants. For example, in a study examining investment decisions, East (1993) found that the subjective norm (influence of friends and relatives) and perceived control (importance of easy access to funds) significantly influenced individuals' investment choices. This highlights the importance of social influences and the perceived ease of acting in financial decision-making. In another study on individual debt behavior, Xiao and Wu (2008) extended the Theory of Planned Behavior (TPB) model and discovered that customer satisfaction contributed to behavioral intention and influenced actual behavior, emphasizing the role of client satisfaction in shaping financial actions. Similarly, in a study involving mortgage clients, Bansal & Taylor (2002) explored factors affecting customer service switching behavior within the context of the Theory of Planned Behavior (TPB). They identified significant interactions between perceived control and intention, perceived control and attitude, and attitude and subjective norms, all of which shaped behavior intention. The Theory of Planned Behavior (TPB) has also been applied to study the financial behaviors of college students concerning cash, credit, and saving management, providing valuable insights into how young adults form their financial behaviors based on their intentions, attitudes, social norms, and perceived control.

=== Important steps in applying Theory of Planned Behavior (TPB) to help change behavior ===
With Theory of Planned Behavior (TPB) as a theoretical framework, certain steps can be followed in efforts to increase the chances of behavior change. The team implementing an intervention should specify the action, target, context, and time. For example, a goal might be to "consume at least one serving of whole grains during breakfast each day in the forthcoming month." In this example, "consuming" is the action, "one serving of whole grains" is the target, "during breakfast each day" is the context, and "in the forthcoming month" is the time. Once a goal is specified, an elicitation phase can be used to identify salient factors that bear on achieving the goal. The pertinent beliefs regarding a specific behavior may differ in different populations. Conducting open-ended elicitation interviews can be useful in applying Theory of Planned Behavior (TPB). Elicitation interviews help to identify relevant behavioral outcomes, referents, cultural factors, facilitating factors, and barriers to change in the focal behavior and target population. The following are sample questions that may be used during an elicitation interview:

- What do you like/ dislike about behavior X?
- What are some disadvantages of doing behavior X?
- Who would be against your doing behavior X?
- Who can you think of that would do behavior X?
- What things make it hard for you to do behavior X?
- If you want to do behavior X, how certain are you that you can?

== Evaluation of the theory ==
=== Strengths ===
Theory of Planned Behavior (TPB) covers people's volitional behavior that cannot be explained by Theory of Reasoned Action (TRA). An individual's behavioral intention cannot be the exclusive determinant of behavior where an individual's control over the behavior is incomplete. By adding "perceived behavioral control," Theory of Planned Behavior (TPB) can explain the relationship between behavioral intention and actual behavior.

Several studies found that, compared to Theory of Reasoned Action (TRA), Theory of Planned Behavior (TPB) better predicts health-related behavioral intentions. Theory of Planned Behavior (TPB) has improved the predictability of intention in various health-related areas, including condom use, leisure, exercise, diet, etc. In addition, Theory of Planned Behavior (TPB) (and Theory of Reasoned Action (TRA)) have helped to explain the individual's social behavior by including social norms as an important contributing explanatory factor.

=== Limitations ===
More recently, some scholars criticize the theory because it ignores the individual's needs prior to engaging in a certain action, needs that would affect behavior regardless of expressed attitudes. For example, a person might have a positive attitude regarding consuming beefsteak and yet not order a beefsteak because she is not hungry. Or, a person might have a negative attitude towards drinking and little intention to drink and yet engage in drinking because he is seeking group membership.

Another limitation is that Theory of Planned Behavior (TPB) does not integrate into the theory the role the individual's emotions play in the development of intentions and during decision-making play. In addition, most of the research on Theory of Planned Behavior (TPB) is correlational. More evidence from randomized experiments would be helpful.

Some experimental studies challenge the assumption that intentions and behavior are consequences of attitudes, social norms, and perceived behavioral control. To illustrate, Sussman et al. (2019) prompted participants to form the intention to support a specific environmental organization, for example, to sign a petition. After this intention was formed, attitudes, social norms, and perceived behavioral control shifted. Participants became more likely to report positive attitudes towards this organization and were more inclined to assume that members of their social group share comparable attitudes. These findings imply that the associations among the three key elements—attitudes, social norms, and perceived behavioral control—and intentions may be bi-directional.

== See also ==
- Behavioral change
- Theory of reasoned action
- Reasoned action approach
