= Icek Ajzen =

American social psychologist

Icek Ajzen (born 1942, Chełm, Poland, is a social psychologist and professor emeritus at the University of Massachusetts Amherst. He received his doctorate from the University of Illinois at Urbana–Champaign, and is best known for his work, with Martin Fishbein, on the theory of planned behavior. Ajzen has been ranked the most influential individual scientist within social psychology in terms of cumulative research impact and, in 2013, received the Distinguished Scientist Award from the Society of Experimental Social Psychology. His research has been influential across diverse fields such as advertising, health psychology, and environmental psychology, and has been cited over 600,000 times.

For 2024 he was awarded the BBVA Foundation Frontiers of Knowledge Award in the category "Social Sciences".
