= Coordinated management of meaning =

Aspect of communication theory

Coordinated management of meaning (CMM), in the social sciences, provides an understanding of how individuals create, coordinate and manage meanings in their process of communication. According to the textbook Introducing Communication Theories, CMM examines "how individuals establish rules for creating and interpreting the meaning and how those rules are enmeshed in a conversation where meaning is constantly being coordinated." Others add that, within CMM, "human communication is viewed as a flexible, open and mutable process evolving in an ongoing joint interaction, which enables movement, shifts and evolving ways with each other". In essence, CMM highlights how communication fosters interpersonal connection and open conversation among individuals or groups, and can be applicable across multiple academic fields and social scenarios.

CMM has been characterized as "a multi-level structural theory in which rules describe the movement or linkages among meanings and actions. From this perspective, it's two persons conversing compromise on an interpersonal system with two interpersonal component systems". Pearce and Cronen, who created the theory, emphasize that CMM is "encouraging us to look at the process of communication and the ways meaning is made" and to "think about the ways that we might act in a critical moment". This framework "enables us to take a collaborative approach" and "arrive together at a shared understanding and agreed plan moving forward". Generally, CMM is a "theory of social construction that posits how we create our relationships and even the world itself through communication". The exchange of information and interpretation of meaning happen through "hierarchies and coordination of the meanings in our messages".

In simple terms, CMM explains how people manage and process their communication with others.

In interpersonal communication, people assign meanings in their messages based on past conversational experiences from previous social realities. Through communication, individuals negotiate common or conflicting meanings of the world around them, thereby creating a new social reality. CMM proposes that meanings can be managed productively to improve communication by coordinating and managing the meaning-making process. It is identified as an "interpersonal theory that describes causal forces in a conversation in two forces: logical force and practical force. This process assumes that people transform sensory perceptions into implications for meaning and action, and that the process for this transformation may be usefully described in terms of the actors' rules".

According to the theory, our social world can be understood through "managing our meanings in our messages based off our values". CMM suggests that it is "our task in interactions to actively manage the meanings that make up our lives and to co-ordinate these with meanings to others, to bring coherence to our social world". Communication follows "rule-governed patterns of interactions" that emulate the logic behind how people act and respond. Social and cultural norms have also been known to influence how we disclose or process information and interpersonally communicate.This is where messages in communication can have disparities in their meaning due to cross-cultural or contextual disclosure differences in how we communicate.

CMM relies on three interdependent elements: coordination, management, and meaning. Together, these elements explain how social realities are created through conversation, and serve as foundations for further applications and models within the theory.

== History and orientation ==
The theory of CMM was developed in the mid-1970s by W. Barnett Pearce (1943–2011) and Vernon E. Cronen. Communication Action and Meaning was devoted to CMM, is a thorough explication of CMM, which Pearce and Cronen introduced to the common scholarly vernacular of the discipline. Their scholarly collaboration at the University of Massachusetts at Amherst offered a major contribution to the philosophy of communication as story-centered, applicable, and ever attentive to the importance of human meaning. Pearce also famously said, "the three principles of CMM are, there are multiple social worlds, these social worlds are made in interactions and through conversations with others, and we are all active agents in the making of social worlds" and by this, our social worlds are ever-changing through which the conversations that we exchange throughout time.

The cluster of ideas in which CMM emerged has moved from the periphery toward greater acceptance, and CMM has continued to evolve along a trajectory from an interpretive social science to one with a critical edge and then to what its founders call a "practical theory".

Aware that the intellectual footing for communication theory had shifted, the first phase of the CMM project involved developing concepts that met the twin criteria of (1) adequately expressing the richness of human communication and (2) guiding empirical investigation. Pearce describes the creation of CMM through the following story:

...I think that I am the first person ever to use the awkward phrase "coordinated management of meaning". Of course, tones of voice are often more informative than the verbal content of what is said, and struggle and frustration were expressed in the tones of voice in which "CMM" was first said. For years, I had been trying to bring together what I was learning from social science research, rhetorical studies, philosophy, theology, and, in my father's term, the "School of Hard Knocks". I felt that most of the models of communication that I knew were useful but that all were limited and limiting in some important ways, and that I had to invent something that was better. Communication is about meaning,... but not just in a passive sense of perceiving messages. Rather, we live in lives filled with meanings and one of our life challenges is to manage those meanings so that we can make our social worlds coherent and live within them with honor and respect. But this process of managing our meanings is never done in isolation. We are always and necessarily coordinating the way we manage our meanings with other people. So, I concluded, communication is about the coordinated management of meaning.

— W. Barnett Pearce

CMM is one of an increasing number of theories that see communication as "performative" (doing things, not just talking "about" them) and "constitutive" (the material substance of the social world, not just a means of transmitting information within it). In CMM-speak, "taking the communication perspective" means looking at communication rather than through it and seeing communication as the means by which we make the objects and events of our social worlds.

The "communication perspective" entails a shift in focus from theory to praxis. According to Rose, language and communication "creates, shapes, and limits the diverse social worlds in which we live, and the coordinated management of meaning is the most comprehensive statement of social construction and emphasizes recursiveness. The level of praxis is fundamental in this recursive process in that communication is a primary social process".

CMM concepts and models are best understood as providing tools for naming aspects of performance. To date, CMM has found greater acceptance among practitioners than among scholars. Taking the communication perspective confers something like "communication literacy"—the ability to inscribe and read the complex process of communication in real-time. Among other things, CMM's concepts and models guide practitioners in helping clients become aware of the patterns of communication which make up aspects of the social world. They want to change and help both clients and practitioners identify openings or "bifurcation points" in everyday lives. Many CMM practitioners have an explicit commitment not only to describe and understand but to improve the conditions in which they and those around them live. They believe that the best way of making better social worlds is to improve the patterns of communication which generate them.

As mentioned, Pearce and Cronen together have set the stage for CMM and have unpacked this theory various times in order to give it the depth it needs. One of their studies, in particular, gained some speed when they wanted to analyze how rules and form of a conversation lead to the significance of the conversation and co-create verbal structures of communication within the social engagement. They found that in their game-like study, respondents reported more engagement based on the structure, or in this case coordination, produced different articulations for determining the value and action of said rules given to them. "Logical force does affect the ability of person's to coordinate conversations and respond to them".

Since this theory has been developed and tested in other disciples, there is a bountiful amount of definitions for CMM. Keeping in mind Pearce and Cronen's contributions, some other definitions entail it as not just a practical theory but also a "social constructionist theory that traces its lineage to the work of American pragmatists". Pearce also says it is a "non-objectivist, realist position that foregrounds the process of communication". That being said, many of these theorists agree it is a practical angle to communication, and communication itself is a "primary social process".

== Basics ==
It has been said that "CMM theory is a kind of multi-tool (like a Swiss Army knife) that is useful in any situation". It is not a single theory but rather a collection of ideas to understand how humans interact during communication. According to CMM, individuals construct their own social realities while engaged in conversation. To put it simply, communicators apply rules in order to understand what is going on during their social interaction. Based on the situation, different rules are applied in order to produce "better" patterns of communication. Often at times, these "constitutive rules change, and so do the regulative rules" that allow transformative empowerment of self perspectives and those of other people. These rules are discussed below further in the management sections.

CMM theory is a fairly complex study focusing on both the complexity of the micro-social processes and the aspects of daily interaction. Overall, it is concerned with how we coordinate and establish meaning during interactions. The theory can be complicated to teach and/or present to others, but it is best understood when it is broken down into the basics. The theory consists of three key concepts, which are further broken down into several different building blocks.

The fundamental building blocks of CMM theory focus specifically on the flow of communication between people. The three different concepts experienced either consciously or unconsciously are coordination, management, and meaning.

=== Coordination ===
Coordination refers to "the degree to which persons perceive that their actions have fitted together into some mutually intelligible sequence or pattern of actions". It exists "when two people attempt to make sense out of the sequencing of messages in their conversation". That is, if people in the interaction can recognize what their partners are talking about, then we say the conversation comes to coordination. Scientists believe that people's desire for coordination in interaction arises from the subjectivity of meaning, which means the same message may have different meanings to different people. In order to avoid this pitfall in communication, people work together to share meanings. Research shows that sense-making is the foundation of coordination. By tokens within the information connected by means of a channel can the logic relationship emerge, then it contributes to the sense-making. Sense-making helps people to establish common understanding then further develops coordination between people.

The act of formulating speech and reaching the initial coordination is where the conversation co-exists between the two parties. The "actions of each person affect and are mutually affected by those of the other person in a coevolving conversation. The unfolding of action is reflexively interpretable within various levels of nested narrative or meaning of contexts". This in some cases, is similar to relational transformation, which is "thought to be and emerge out of this combination of increased awareness and strength regarding one's own needs, together with increased appreciation and compassion toward the needs of the other party" and where this understanding is taking place in coordination. Relational transformation occurs when, "recognition or other perspectives are happening for either parties".

The concept of coordination has to do with the fact that our actions do not stand alone with regard to communication. The words or actions that we use during a conversation come together to produce patterns. These patterns, also known as stories lived, influence the behavior used during each interaction as a way to collaborate. Pearce and Cronen are quick to point out that coordination does not imply a commitment to coordinate "smoothly", but rather the concept is meant to provide the basis for being mindful of the other side of the story.

This mindfulness also is considered when looking into the ethical production of CMM. As an example, For organizations, "an interpersonal ethical analysis of these situations leads to the suggestion that communicators gain proficient knowledge of ethical principles before considering strategic ambiguity as a viable approach to organizational communications".

There is three possible outcomes of coordination:

1. People in the interaction achieve coordination.
2. People in the interaction failed to achieve coordination.
3. People in the interaction achieve some degree of coordination.

If the interaction fails to achieve coordination or achieve partially coordination, the possible solution is to move the level of meaning to another level.

=== Management ===
Our interactions are guided and defined by rules. "Interactants must understand the social reality and then incorporate rules as they decide how to act in a given situation." From the use of rules, individuals manage and coordinate meanings in the conversation. "Once rules are established in a dialogue, interactants will have a sufficiently common symbolic framework for communication." For instance, it would be ambiguous if a friend says, "I hate you". Does the friend really hate whomever he/she is speaking to, or he/she is just expressing his/her feelings at the moment? Rules will help clarify and explain this kind of meaning.

- Constitutive rules: refer to "how behavior should be interpreted within a given context". It tells us what the given behavior means and linking belief to one another and behaviors to beliefs. In the example above, "I hate you" in some contexts counts as an expression of slight dissatisfaction. Constitutive rules "are rules of meaning, used by people involved in the communication process to interpret or understand an event".
- Regulative rules: refer to "some sequence of action that an individual undertakes, and they communicate what happens next in a conversation." They are also referred to as "cognitive reorganizations of constitutive rules". In other words, it means the behavior that is requested in certain situations. Regulative rules link the meanings in the interaction with the consequences they result to. Our body reaction can reflect on the contents of interaction. Regulative rules "are rules of action used to determine how to respond or behave".
- "Unwanted repetitive patterns": It refers to "the sequential and recurring conflictual episodes that are considered unwanted by the individuals in the conflict." This phenomenon happens because "two people with particular rule systems follow a structure that obligates them to perform specific behaviors." Several reasons count for unwanted repetitive patterns. First, sometimes people can't find other options than being in conflict. Second, people may feel comfortable in a conflict situation because they have experience with what others will behave in this kind of situation. Third, people may be tired of finding a resolution to the conflict situation.
- "Not everything within communication can be explained", which is called Mystery. It is the recognition that "the world and our experience of it are more than any of the particular stories that make it coherent or any of the activities in which we engage". Mystery has to do with the sense of awe or wonder when communication leads to a surprising outcome. Put more simply, it is the feeling (anything from attraction to hate) one experiences when engaged in conversation that cannot be linked to the situation as a whole.

CMM theory sees each conversation as a complex interconnected series of events in which each individual affects and is affected by the other. Although the primary emphasis of CMM theory has to do with the concept of first-person communication, known as a participatory view, once the concepts are understood they are more readily visible during other interactions. Furthermore, this knowledge can be applied to similar situations, which will, in turn, lead to more effective communication.

These rules for CMM offer the foundation for how this theory works. According to Cronen, CMM "states we interpret and act on the bases of these rules. Individuals within any social situation first want to understand what is going on and apply rules to figure things out. They then act on the basis of their understanding, employing rules to decide what kind of action is appropriate".

In this case, management can also be very different. There are other ways of viewing this management phase that focuses more on the learning and contextual processing of the messages we are receiving. One example of management is known to be seen and understood similar to peer coaching. This is known as "a type of helping relationship in which two people of equal status actively participate in helping each other on specific tasks or problems, with a mutual desire to be helpful... it is grounded in attributes of mutual growth, learning, and development of both parties". Similar to peer coaching where power plays and dynamics are performed, "this emphasis highlights the relational qualities of meaning making by suggesting that the associated style, pace, and mood of the message content are all relevant to the dynamic affecting trust, compassion, and accountability. The peer coaching relationship provides a container for peers to examine and expand insights into actions in other areas of their lives". Peer coaching is also a great way to visualize this meaning phase due to the fact in coaching; they can deconstruct your original thoughts or narrative and make your coordination open to other perspectives before you make meaning of a message in a purely one-sided biased way. In a sense, peer coaching is a scenario where one can visualize the coach telling the pupil to be encouraged by new opinions, ideas, and people so messages can be more open and equal in communication.

=== Meaning ===
Coordinated management of meaning states that people "organize meaning in a hierarchical manner." Theorists on CMM were in agreement on two points regarding hierarchical meaning. "First, the hierarchy of meaning defines the context in which regulative and constitutive rules are to be understood. Second, these contexts are arranged in a hierarchy of abstractness, such that higher levels of the hierarchy help to define – and may subsume – lower level." It can be interpreted to each of the contexts in the "hierarchical can be understood by looking at the other contexts, and each context is always contextualizing other contexts."

This hierarchal manner, meanings are mutually exclusive during this phase, or at times if messages are misunderstood, meaning produces separate orderings. There are two important rules that occur during this meaning that produce a mutually exclusive hierarchal ordering of meaning: constitutive and regulative rules. Constitutive rules in meaning are "employed by social actors to link the different levels of their meaning hierarchies with each other and with the unfolding action that is occurring...It addresses how to assign meaning to what is being addressed and what actions can be defined to this". This meaning here in this exchange is important because messages have different meanings to other people if not expressed in a non-biased way or not expressed in the way one originally intends to do so. Proving this, "individuals tell stories from particular vantage points in the narrative meaning hierarchies to create coherence". This is also where we then consider the regulative rules. Regulative rules in meaning are "structures that have the temporal quality to them and relate to how individuals manage the unfolding sequence of actions in a social episode". The more coordination and narratives in the messages being exchanged, the "more meaning contexts recursively affect and are affected by the evolving actions in a conversation" which ideally is critical to point out as a conversation progresses.

There are six levels of meaning (listed from lower level to higher level): content, speech act, episodes, relationship, life scripts, and cultural patterns. In the six categories below, we also assign a moral value to the messages we receive when we are conscious of them and or unconscious of them. When consciously aware of them, they can either be "obligatory, legitimate, undermined, or prohibited," or when unconsciously aware of them, they can be "caused, probable, random, or blocked".

==== Content ====
The content or message, according to CMM theory, relates to the raw data and information spoken aloud during communication. To put it simply, content is the words used to communicate. The content is essentially the basic building blocks of any language; however, the content by itself is not sufficient to establish the meaning of the communication.

==== Speech act ====
Another integral part of the CMM theory includes the speech act. "Speech acts communicate the intention of the speaker and indicate how a particular communication should be taken." The simplest explanation of a speech act is "actions that you perform by speaking. They include compliments, insults, promises, threats, assertions, and questions". CMM theory draws upon the speech act theory, which further breaks down speech acts into separate categories of sounds or utterances. Though the speech act theory is much more detailed, it is important to have an understanding of both illocutionary and perlocutionary utterances.

- An illocutionary utterance is a speech that intends to make contact with a receiver.
- A perlocutionary utterance includes speech that intends to alter the behavior of the receiver.

There are many different utterances or speech acts, including questions, answers, commands, promises, and statements. Having knowledge of each of these plays a large part in an individual being able to participate in a communications exchange.

==== Episodes ====
An episode is a situation created by persons in a conversation. The same content can take on different meaning when the situation is different. For example, a phrase used among close family or friends may take on an entirely different meaning in a job interview. In the interactions, people may punctuate differently on the same episode. This will result in people dealing with the differences in their punctuations on subsequent episodes. Especially when people situated in the bi-cultural or multi-cultural situation have identified a number of specific acts which occurred in an equivalent situation in the other culture, it would have totally disrupted the episode.

==== Relationship ====
Relationship is the higher level of the meaning, where "relational boundaries in that parameters are established for attitudes and behaviors." This building block is fairly easy to understand as it is the dynamic of what connects two (or more) individuals during an exchange of information. Examples of a relationship could be defined as a parent/child, teacher/student, strangers, etc. Communication between strangers would likely be different from conversations amongst family members.

==== Life scripts ====
Life scripts can be understood as the patterns of episodes. On this level, "every individual's history of relationships and interactions will influence rules and interaction patterns." Life scripts are similar to the autobiography of individuals. It comprises the person's exceptions for a variety of communicative events. Several CMM texts describe this building block as a "script for who we are" as the role an individual plays in the movie of life. For example, an individual may believe they are funny, and therefore may act according to that perspective while engaged in different conversations.

==== Cultural patterns ====
The concept of culture in CMM theory relates to a set of rules for acting and speaking which govern what we understand to be normal in a given episode. There are different rules for social interaction depending on the culture. To some extent, during communication, individuals act in accordance with their cultural values. While we often don't even realize that culture impacts communication during day-to-day interactions, people must learn to be compatible with individuals from different cultures in order to have effective communication.

Meaning Image

Below are listed with common rules of the relationship and can be further explained in the following Models and Applications sections. Image cited in the bracket.

== Models and applications ==
Pearce is adamant that CMM is not just an interpretive theory but is meant to be a practical theory as well. There is extensive literature involving the use of CMM to address family violence, intra-community relations, workplace conflict, and many other social issues. A research employs CMM to understand the "perceived acts of discrimination manifested within the context of everyday interactions." By applying CMM into research, the researchers are able to explicate the rules of meaning-making that majority and minority groups followed in understanding the discrimination act. Another application example was done in 1994 when CMM was initially recognized by people. It believes that the framework of CMM provides an understanding of "the structure and process of consumer decision making by placing those decisions within the context of a family's social reality".

Along this line, CMM theorists have used or developed several analysis models to help understand and improve communication. Examples for the hierarchy model have been adapted from ones Pearce uses in one of his writings where he analyzes the courtroom conversation between Ramzi Yousef, the individual convicted of bombing the World Trade Center in 1994, and Kevin T. Duffy, the federal judge who presided over his trial. In Yousef's statement before sentencing, he criticizes the US for its hypocrisy; he accuses the US of being the premier terrorist and reasserts his pride in his fight against the US. At the sentencing, Duffy accuses Yousef of being a virus, evil, perverting the principles of Islam, and interested only in death. Neither individual really talks to the other, but rather at them.

Some common models include 3 phases listed as "daisy model, hierarchy of meaning model, and the LUUUTT model". The LUUUTT is also known as the strange loop model due to its various combinations.

Daisy Model

The daisy model is used to describe the characteristics of the parties involved in the coordination. In some ways, it lists a description of who or what they are or what they are seeking in the relationship. This allows perspectives to be formed. According to Parker, "facilitators suggest that they share with each other aspects of their backgrounds and their careers relevant to their peer coaching goals, as mentioned before, by first drawing a diagram in the shape of a daisy using the petals to depict how they would describe themselves". They later say, "petals would also include key influences that have helped them shape their narrative". Some questions this model addresses would be: "what are the different influences/voices/perspectives that are influencing me? and what are the perspectives that are influencing the other person?. These are very important questions to consider when we want to unpack how coordination, management, and meaning occur if perspectives are the lens.

=== Hierarchy model ===
The hierarchy model is the hierarchy of organized meanings as illustrated in the § Meaning section. The hierarchy model is a tool for an individual to explore the perspectives of their conversational partners while also enabling them to take a more thorough look at their own personal perspective. The elements at the top of each list form the overall context in which each story takes place and have an influence on the elements below them. The levels of meaning from lowest to highest are: content, speech act, episodes, relationship, life scripts, and cultural patterns.

Stephen W. Littlejohn and Karen A. Foss in their book Theories of Human Communication (tenth edition) describe a type of logical force called contextual force. Contextual force causes a person to follow a form of logic that leads one to believe that an action or interpretation is a direct result of, and is appropriate to, the context. For example, "How else could I have reacted?" or "Naturally I acted that way, it was appropriate to the situation" leads to the mentality of "I did what I had to do." Secondly, in CMM, contexts are extremely important, and they are not static and unchanging. For example, a relationship that is longstanding can contextualize the episode of an ugly argument as something unpleasant but unavoidable. The couple will most likely worth though this ugly argument because of their relationship contextualizing the episode. However, an episode of an ugly argument can contextualize a relationship if a couple is on their first date. Therefore, the argument is more likely to contextualize the relationship is over or not worth pursuing. What contextualizes what in the hierarchy of organized meanings overlaps and is interlinked in a complicated hierarchy of meanings which can shift at any moment.

The hierarchy of meaning model addresses questions of: "what are the different contexts that are happening simultaneously?, which layers are most foregrounding or relevant?, how are they shifting as you share your story?, and how might I be personalizing this too much or not enough?".

=== Serpentine model ===
The CMM theorists take the hierarchy model a step further by reinforcing the importance of interaction and adding the aspect of time. Pearce stresses that communication cannot be done alone and that furthermore, this usually occurs before or after another's actions. Therefore, understanding past events and their impact on individuals is essential to improving communication. This new model is called the serpentine model and visually demonstrates how communication is a back and forth interaction between participants rather than just a simple transmission of information.

This model addresses questions of: "what do I want to make in the next turn?, how am I marking the beginning and end of this episode?, and how would it be different if I went further back or further forward?".

=== Charmed and strange loop ===
The embedded contexts illustrated in the hierarchy model represent a stable hierarchy. It suggests that higher levels subsume lower levels. Meanwhile, sometimes "lower levels can reflect back and affect the meaning of higher levels." This process is termed "loop". CMM believes that there is a stronger "contextual effect", which works from higher levels to the lower levels, and a weaker "implicative effect", which works the other way. When loops are consistent with the hierarchy, it is identified as a "charmed loop". In this kind of interaction, each person's perceptions and actions help to reinforce the other's perceptions and actions.

When the lower levels are inconsistent with, the higher levels, it is called a "strange loop". Essentially, "a 'strange' loop is a repetitive interactional pattern that alternates between contradictory meanings". For example, the alcoholic identifies that he is an alcoholic and then quits drinking. Since he has quit drinking, he convinces himself that he is not really an alcoholic, and so he starts drinking again, which makes him an alcoholic. He alternates between contradictory perceptions of being an alcoholic and not being an alcoholic. The charmed and strange loop model also has its applications. In research regarding the social construction of male college student logical forces, the charmed and strange loop model was utilized in studying male college students' narratives in describing their memorable sexual experiences.

Less commonly, there is a third variation called the "subversive" loop. Texts and contexts within a subversive loop are mutually invalidating and can prevent coherence and coordination. It may result in intentionally outrageous behavior, efforts to act in uninterruptible ways, or refusal to recognize the possibility that the outsider can understand the situation of the insider.

This model is also commonly known as the LUUUTT model, which stands for "LIVED, UNTOLD, UNHEARD, UNKNOWN, STORYTELLING, AND STORIES TOLD", which are further explained in its designated questions. It addresses questions of: "What is the storytelling? What is the story that is not told? Not heard? Not known? Not allowable?".

=== Applications ===
CMM theory is regarding as a kind of multi-tool by providing a framework to structure different themes. In this regard, there are many qualitative studies using CMM to illustrate its utility for framing their findings. Because people interpret messages and know the rules or guide which can follow and have actions constitute appropriate responses. Now, it focuses on cultural influence to get insights into how individuals negotiate complex messages occurring at different levels of meaning. Since CMM attempts to explain the process by a group member to make sense out of the regular path of messages and carried out into a group conversation. So, according to CMM, individual perspective with group approach conversation needs to combine and create a better meaning-building.

- Qualitative experiment framework tool
- Online chat room user experience by applying CMM theory, conduct a textual analysis.
- Data analysis tool though on how people use complex, multilevel systems of reference to derive meaning and guide behaviors

== Benefits ==
Communication can be difficult and especially when the people involved are not on the same page. Coordinated Management of Meaning helps bring purpose and clarity to a conversation and help extinguish those blurred lines. People are prone to misunderstanding others and creating catastrophic miscommunication within a relationship, ultimately deteriorating the connection. CMM is beneficial towards interpersonal relationships for this reason. Per Columbia University this theory allows people to understand their own feelings while also learning to understand others and creating harmony between the two, which in the end creates a more sustainable relationship.

== Theory criticism ==
In order to provide criticism of the CMM theory, it is important to establish a baseline for what accounts for a "good" study. Many scholars use different criteria for determining what makes a theory relevant, but they most often surround the following six concepts.

1. Social scientists suggest that theories should be evaluated on their ability to produce hypotheses that are consistent with relevant evidence. CMM theory falls short under the criteria of rule 1 as it does not set out to provide measurable hypotheses that can be compared to any other situation. While CMM tries to outline the cause and effect relationship of communication, it fails to create consistencies as the theory dictates that each situation is different. However, those who hold other constructions of the nature of theory would not see this criterion as valid for an interpretive theory.
2. General theories are preferred to less general theories. From the perspective of this rule, CMM theory is very general; however, it is also very vague. The theory has difficulty focusing on exactly what is important in each interaction, thereby not allowing those who study the theory to understand what is considered critical in communicative interaction.
3. Theories that produce several hypotheses are preferred to those that produce few, at least from a social scientific (or "postpostive") perspective. From this perspective, CMM theory fails as it neglects to have even a single hypothesis that is testable. However, interpretive theorists suggest that a theory might provide a useful lens for interpreting reality or provide new insight for interpreting specific behaviors, texts or other phenomena. By this regard, CMM provides a richer understanding of how speech acts occur within contexts than, say, speech acts theory.
4. It is more beneficial to evaluate research programs rather than individual theories. As CMM theory focuses on levels of contact between two (or more) persons engaged in communication, these findings from CMM research contribute beyond mere observation it is unsuccessful as a way to evaluate anything other than individual interactions.
5. The overall implications of a theory mean that those with several are preferred over those with few. CMM theory focuses on how we create our social environments in the present, however it fails to predict how the theory can affect future events. But, once again, the notion of "prediction," like "explanation of causal factors" applies more to social scientific/post-positive theories and may not be an appropriate criterion for evaluating a theory of this nature.
6. Simplicity is considered a virtue. In accordance with this rule, CMM theory falls short. CMM is an extremely broad theory with many different terms, views and loopholes which makes a multifaceted study of communication even more complex

CMM has been criticized for being too broad in its scope and highly abstract in its nature. In 1987, Brenders stated that "CMM has missed many of the linguistic, international, and theoretical nuances necessary for an understanding of communicative meaning". CMM is also criticized for its conceptual apparatus being incomplete "with regard to a full examination of the material layering of practices".

Another common critique is that CMM theory should not be seen as an interpretive theory.

From a humanistic perspective, CMM theory is seen as valuable as it seeks to provide a way to clarify communication for better interaction and understanding. Its utility lies in "how people achieve meaning, their potential recurring conflicts, and the influence of the self on the communication process." It promotes reform by encouraging individuals to explain particular viewpoints in order to reach an understanding.

Pearce and Cronen are still building upon the CMM theory that was originally outlined in the 1970s. By constant corrections and revisions, the theorists are working toward improving the examination of communication interactions; however, with each new update, minor course corrections alter the terms and meanings, increasing the complexity of the overall theory.

CMM has guided research in an array of contexts and disciplines.

== Related communication theories ==
- Speech act theory: The idea that the meaning of a conversation is not limited to the meaning of the words. The words may gain new meaning depending on the situation or how they are used. Language is an action rather than just a means of sharing information. Important people: J. L. Austin, Adolf Reinach, John R. Searle.
- Symbolic interactionism: An influential perspective within sociology that purposed people's actions are guided by how they value things, which is in turn influenced by their society. Important people: George Herbert Mead, Herbert Blumer.
- Systems theory: A study of the abstract organization of phenomena, independent of their substance, type, or spatial or temporal scale of existence. Important people: Ludwig von Bertalanffy, W. Ross Ashby, Anatol Rapoport, Paul Watzlawick.
- Dialogism: Initially based on the interrelated conversation between works of literature and later expanded to the greater social experience. Important people: Mikhail Bakhtin.
- Structuration theory: Examines how the production and reproduction of social life is fundamentally a recursive process that stretches across potentially great spans of time and space. Important people: Anthony Giddens.
