= Hurtful communication =

Hurtful communication refers to verbal or non-verbal communication perceived as emotionally damaging, and occurs when the receiver perceives a specific social interaction as upsetting or harmful emotionally. It encompasses a range of messages—from criticism and rejection to sarcasm and insults—that can cause emotional distress, undermine relational satisfaction, and lead to long-term psychological consequences. Negative social interactions can be intentional, when one or both parties are involved in interpersonal conflict, or unintentional, such as when misunderstandings occur. Actions such as failure to recognize accomplishments or significant dates can cause hurtful outcomes within relationships.

Hurtful communication often emerges within close relational contexts, where individuals have developed emotional intimacy and shared personal information, making them more vulnerable to perceived offenses. While research primarily focuses on romantic and parent–child relationships, recent studies have expanded its application to a variety of interpersonal domains, including sibling dynamics, digital interactions, friendships, educator–student relationships, and workplace environments. In relation to other negative emotions such as anger or guilt, hurt is more often linked to interpersonal interaction. Interactions are adversely affected by hurtful communication. Hurtful communication negatively affects trust within a relationship resulting in more defensive behavior by both parties.

== Defining hurtful communication ==
Types of hurtful verbal communications and actions:

- Devaluation – the perception that one is not as close as thought. This can be a result of verbal or non-verbal communication where one party feels less important than they desire within the exchange. Often, devaluation is manifest through betrayal and/or rejection.
- Relational transgressions – the violation of relationship norms which causes one party to feel betrayal.
- Hurtful messages – words that result in pain. Commonly these messages are combinations of profanity, threats or attacks on appearance, competencies, origins or character.

Both the content of the message and the delivery play a part in how a hurtful message is interpreted. Content that provides new information to the recipient is considered more sensitive and better received than content that insults the person's intelligence. In terms of delivery, hurtful communication packaged in the form of giving unsolicited advice may be seen as more supportive than the same information in the form of giving orders.

Factors such as whether the hurtful communication was intentional and the frequency of occurrence has an impact on the meaning of the event. Types of hurtful communication include relational denigration, humiliation, aggression, intrinsic flaw, shock, tasteless humor, misunderstood intent, and discouragement as probable causes of hurt feelings. Hurtful communication is interaction that causes the receiver to feel marginalized.

== Use of hurtful communication ==
Communication is not exclusively a sender/receiver exchange of finite information. What is communicated through verbal and nonverbal communication is interpreted by both parties through a lens of schema of previous experiences and knowledge. Rather than scholarly research defining phrases and terms that universally are considered hurtful, researchers focus on what communication causes negative feelings in the receiver. Expressions of honest feelings by one party can be devastating to the other such as professions of attraction to another person or expressing disinterest in continuing a romantic relationship. A child displaying disinterest in a parent's involvement could be considered hurtful communication just as a parent criticism could be hurtful to an adolescent. In less familiar relationships such as acquaintances or strangers, hurtful communication is more general and typically focused on observations such as gender, race, sexual orientation or identity, ethnicity, national origin, or religion often in the form of verbal slurs and hate words.

== Responses to hurtful communication ==
Guerrero, Anderson & Afifi (2010) noted three ways people react and respond to hurtful communication:

- Active verbal responses- Verbally confronting the offending party.
- Acquiescent responses- Acknowledging the offender's ability to inflict pain and surrendering. This action includes forgiveness.
- Invulnerable responses- Avoidance of acceptance of a hurtful message often deflected through humor or ignoring. Rumination (over-focusing on the occurrence rather than solutions) may prevent one from moving past the infraction.

It is probable that one or more (even all three) responses occur in when someone is faced with hurtful communication. In cases where the injured party perceived the hurtful communication intentional relational distancing often occurred which complicates resolution.

== Mitigating factors ==
=== Humor ===
A study by Young and Bippus (2001) explored how humor influences the perception and impact of hurtful messages in personal relationships. Their findings indicated that humorously phrased remarks were generally associated with more favorable interpretations, with recipients less likely to attribute malicious intent to the speaker. This use of humor appeared to offer communicative benefits by softening the emotional impact and enabling recipients to maintain social face. However, the effect was not the same across all topics. Hurtful comments involving intellectual abilities, relational withdrawal, or personal aspirations were more likely to be perceived as intentionally harmful, even when framed humorously. These topics may represent particularly sensitive areas in which humor is interpreted as dismissive or undermining rather than mitigating.

=== Alcohol ===
A 2021 study, that examined the relationship between drunk texting and emotional dysregulation, found a positive correlation. The findings suggest that interventions targeting emotional regulation skills may be beneficial.

=== Romantic relationships ===
Scholarly research on the topic of hurtful communication in romantic relationships is more readily available than any other category. Romantic partners use communication to construct and evolve their relationship or as a means to sabotage stability. Partners rate their relationships based on the current communication (whether positive or negative). Perhaps due to the closeness and interdependency of romantic relationships, communication between romantic partners that is deemed hurtful has significant impact on current and future interaction. Young, Bippus, & Dunbar (2015) state the intimate knowledge of the significant other's hopes, fears and insecurities enable each party to inflict pain more deeply than others in one's life. Intimate knowledge of all aspects of another's life gives access that can be used both positively and negatively. In conflict interaction, observations from one's partner may be processed differently than a non-conflict interaction.

Self-uncertainty often occurs after a negative exchange rather than partner-uncertainty. When both self-uncertainty and partner-uncertainty occur the relationship status is called into question. Malachowski et al., (2015) found when self-uncertainty or partner-uncertainty occurred, it was more likely the parties would engage in forgiveness after a hurtful communication event theorizing it was part of the coping mechanism to reduce relationship-uncertainty.

=== Parent–child relationships ===
The parent–child relationship is to some degree involuntary but both parties develop communication that provides the structure for the relationship. Relationships between parent and child is a deeply connected bond that evolves over time where familiarity and the changing dynamics can result in hurtful communications. The responsibility of parents to nurture their offspring has been theorized to result in more hurt feelings for the parents than the child when hurtful communications occur. While adolescence also feel pain from hurtful communications, adolescence may be less likely to verbalize their feelings perhaps due to the parent-child dependence that exists. Perceived rejection or betrayal between parent-child results in doubts of self, other and relationship as questioning of honesty, intimacy and closeness often occurs. Self-identity and family-identity is unstable when hurtful communication has or is occurring because eventually communication will be impaired.

In this context, researchers have identified that a negative family environment can greatly influence communication and relational satisfaction within families. Such environments are characterized by persistent patterns of criticism, neglect, aggression, and emotional withdrawal. These environments not only increase the likelihood of psychological challenges like depression, anxiety, and low self-esteem, but also interfere with an individual's ability to express and receive affectionate communication. While affectionate communication typically supports stronger family relationships, its positive effects are often diminished or blocked altogether when individuals grow up in an environment marked by frequent emotional pain. These hurtful dynamics not only affect how family members relate to each other but may also influence future relationships outside the family.

=== Digital Contexts ===
Hurtful communication can also occur through digital means, such as text messaging or direct messaging on social media apps, and presents unique challenges due to the absence of non-verbal cues and potential misinterpretation of tone or intent.

=== Cultural Perspectives ===
A study by Tokunaga (2008) found that cultural norms and values play a significant role in how individuals interpret and respond to hurtful communication.

== Current and Future Research on Hurtful Communication ==
Current research on hurtful communication continues to examine how individuals interpret, experience, and respond to emotionally damaging interactions mainly within close relational contexts—such as romantic partnerships, parent-child relationships, and friendships. However there is increasing interest in how hurtful communication manifests in educational, workplace, and digital environments.

Recent studies have explored the immediate emotional effects of hurtful messages, including feelings of sadness, anger, or betrayal, as well as their potential to undermine relational trust and satisfaction. However, scholars have also begun to investigate the conditions under which hurtful communication may be appraised positively. Research suggests that in certain situations, recipients may interpret such messages as expressions of concern, comfort, or assistance, depending on contextual cues and perceived intent. For example, comments that reflect genuine sympathy or attempt to provide useful guidance may be perceived as less harmful—or even constructive—despite initially causing emotional discomfort.

Despite these advances, researchers acknowledge ongoing challenges in defining and measuring concepts such as "hurt," "hurt feelings," and "hurtful interactions." Much of the data relies on self-reported experiences which can limit findings.

== See also ==
- Interpersonal Communication
- Setting boundaries
