= Sonja K. Foss =

American communication scholar and educator

Sonja K. Foss (born January 26, 1950) is a rhetorical scholar and educator in the discipline of communication. Her research and teaching interests are in contemporary rhetorical theory and criticism, feminist perspectives on communication, the incorporation of marginalized voices into rhetorical theory and practice, and visual rhetoric.

== History and background ==
Sonja Foss and her twin sister, Karen A. Foss, also a rhetorical scholar and educator in communication, were born in Portland, Oregon, on January 26, 1950, and grew up in Eugene, Oregon. Foss earned a B.A. in Romance Languages (French and Spanish) from the University of Oregon in 1972, an M.A. in speech (Rhetoric and Public Address) from the University of Oregon in 1973, and a Ph.D. in Communication Studies from Northwestern University in 1976. She taught at Virginia Tech (1977–1978); Norfolk State University (1978–1980); the University of Denver (1980–1986); the University of Oregon (1986–1989); St. Louis University (1989–1990); Ohio State University (1990–1996); and the University of Colorado Denver (1997–present), where she served as chair of the Department of Communication from 1997 to 2003.

== Scholarly work ==
Foss is the author, coauthor, or coeditor of nine books, and she has published over fifty book chapters and essays in communication journals. Foss regularly presents her research at regional and national conventions and has presented lectures on her work in Sweden and China. She served for seven years (1981–1988) as the coeditor (with Karen A. Foss) of the journal Women's Studies in Communication and serves on the editorial boards of various communication journals. Some of Foss's work provides overviews of contemporary rhetorical theories and guidelines for analyzing rhetoric. Contemporary Perspectives on Rhetoric (with Karen A. Foss and Robert Trapp) summarizes the theories of ten rhetorical theorists, including Kenneth Burke, bell hooks, Jean Baudrillard, and Michel Foucault. Her textbook Rhetorical Criticism: Exploration and Practice offers various methods for analyzing rhetorical artifacts, including the cluster, ideological, metaphoric, and narrative methods. Although some of Foss's work provides accessible ways into conventional theories of and methods for studying rhetoric, the primary focus of her research is on reconceptualizing communication concepts and theories. She often takes a communication theory or concept and asks what it would look like if it were built on different assumptions, different values, different kinds of symbols, or the speaking practices of previously marginalized groups. Foss's work in the area of feminist perspectives on communication is one way in which she reconceptualizes communication theory and practice. When she entered the communication discipline in the 1970s, a period characterized by "womanless communication," there "was nothing in the curriculum about women or feminism." Her early efforts in this area were designed largely to introduce the communication discipline to great women speakers and social movements involving women in an effort to make them legitimate data for study. These efforts are illustrated by her articles on women priests in the Episcopal Church and the debate on the Equal Rights Amendment.

Foss's later feminist work has been concerned with transforming "the communication discipline as a result of feminist understandings, insights, and scholarship." She calls herself a feminist reconstructionist in that she seeks to reconstruct communication theories and concepts that are based on patriarchal values and assumptions and the speaking practices of elite white men. Her objective is to create "a more comprehensive description of communication processes—to describe as fully as possible the diverse communicative experiences that characterize symbol use in all of its variety." She also wants "to challenge and transform the ideology of domination that pervades Western culture," so she is interested in assessing theories and practices to see which of them re-inscribe this ideology and how they might be transformed.

The theory of invitational rhetoric, which Foss developed with Cindy L. Griffin, is an example of her reconceptualization work from a feminist perspective. The theory reconceptualizes the definition of rhetoric and challenges the assumption that all rhetoric is designed to persuade. A similar project is Feminist Rhetorical Theories (with Karen A. Foss and Cindy L. Griffin), in which the rhetorical theories of nine feminist theorists such as Sally Miller Gearhart, Gloria Anzaldúa, and Sonia Johnson are explicated, providing the communication field with alternatives to traditional rhetorical theories. Inviting Transformation: Presentational Speaking for a Changing World, written with Karen A. Foss, is another example of Foss's efforts at reconceptualizing; in this textbook, Foss and Foss present a new model of public speaking that incorporates invitational principles and the speaking practices of marginalized groups. Foss's article on two paradigms of change, written with Karen A. Foss, is another example of her reconceptualization efforts. In this article, Foss and Foss propose an alternative to the paradigm of persuasion that characterizes how change traditionally has been conceptualized in the communication discipline.

Foss's work on the visual image as communication is another way in which she questions and reconceptualizes communication theories and concepts. When visual images are used as the data of studies, she suggests, theories of communication must be expanded to encompass these different types of symbols. Examples of her work in this area are studies of the Vietnam Veterans Memorial, visual argumentation, the appeal of visual images and her proposal for a method for evaluating visual images.

Foss also assists graduate students and faculty members develop into successful academic writers, helping to demystify the academic writing and publishing process. She is the author, with William Waters, of Destination Dissertation: A Traveler's Guide to a Done Dissertation, in which travel is used as a metaphor for writing a dissertation. She is the founder of Scholars' Retreat, writing retreats that provide individualized assistance for those who want to complete their theses, dissertations, and other academic publications.

== Awards ==
Foss has been the recipient of numerous awards, including the following:

- Outstanding Faculty Achievement Award, College of Liberal Arts and Sciences, University of Colorado Denver, 2013.
- Douglas W. Ehninger Distinguished Rhetorical Scholar Award, National Communication Association, 2012.
- Distinguished Scholar Award, Western States Communication Association, 2011.
- Feminist Scholar Award, Organization for Research on Women and Communication (with Karen A. Foss), 2010. The award recognized the article "Our Journey to Repowered Feminism: Expanding the Feminist Toolbox," published in Women's Studies in Communication.
- Gender Scholar of the Year, Southern Communication Association (with Karen A. Foss), 2005.
- Outstanding Book Award, Organization for the Study of Communication, Language, and Gender (with Karen A. Foss and Cindy L. Griffin), 2000. The award recognized the book Feminist Rhetorical Theories.
- Francine Merritt Award for contributions to women in communication, Women's Caucus, Speech Communication Association, 1993.

== Bibliography ==
=== Books ===
- Foss, Sonja K., Mary E. Domenico, and Karen A. Foss. Gender Stories: Negotiating Identity in a Binary World. Long Grove, IL: Waveland, 2013. (ISBN 978-1-57766-791-9)
- Foss, Sonja K., and William Waters. Destination Dissertation: A Traveler's Guide to a Done Dissertation. Lanham, MD: Rowman & Littlefield, 2007; 2nd edition, 2016. (ISBN 978-1-4422-4614-0)
- Foss, Sonja K., Karen A. Foss, and Cindy L. Griffin, eds., Readings in Feminist Rhetorical Theory. Thousand Oaks, CA: Sage, 2004; reissued Long Grove, IL: Waveland, 2006. (ISBN 978-1-57766-497-0)
- Foss, Sonja K., Karen A. Foss, and Robert Trapp. Contemporary Perspectives on Rhetoric. Long Grove, IL: Waveland, 1985; 2nd edition, 1991; 3rd edition, 2002; 4th edition, 2014. (ISBN 978-1-4786-1524-8)
- Foss, Karen A., Sonja K. Foss, and Robert Trapp, eds. Readings in Contemporary Rhetoric. Long Grove, IL: Waveland, 2002. (ISBN 1-57766-206-7)
- Foss, Sonja K., Karen A. Foss, and Cindy L. Griffin. Feminist Rhetorical Theories. Thousand Oaks, CA: Sage, 1999; reissued Long Grove, IL: Waveland, 2006. (ISBN 978-1-57766-496-3)
- Foss, Sonja K. Rhetorical Criticism: Exploration and Practice. Long Grove, IL: Waveland, 1988; 2nd edition, 1996; 3rd edition, 2004; 4th edition, 2008; 5th edition, 2018. (ISBN 978-1-4786-3489-8)
- Foss, Sonja K., and Karen A. Foss. Inviting Transformation: Presentational Speaking for a Changing World. Long Grove, IL: Waveland, 1994; 2nd edition, 2003; 3rd ed., 2011. (ISBN 978-1-57766-721-6)
- Foss, Karen A., and Sonja K. Foss. Women Speak: The Eloquence of Women's Lives. Long Grove, IL: Waveland, 1991. (ISBN 0-88133-547-9)

=== Articles ===
- Foss, Sonja K., and Kimberly C. Elliott. "Acting to Alter Privilege by Maintaining the Structural-Performative Paradox." Women & Language 38 (2016): 7-31.
- Foss, Sonja K., and Karen A. Foss. "Constricted and Constructed Potentiality: An Inquiry into Paradigms of Change." Western Journal of Communication 75 (2011): 205–38, DOI: 10.1080/10570314.2011.553878.
- Foss, Sonja K., and Karen A. Foss. "Our Journey to Repowered Feminism: Expanding the Feminist Toolbox." Women's Studies in Communication 32 (2009): 36–62.
- Foss, Sonja K., William Waters, and Bernard J. Armada. "Toward a Theory of Agentic Orientation: Rhetoric and Agency in Run Lola Run." Communication Theory 17 (2007): 205–30, DOI: 10.1111/j.1468-2885.2007.00293.x.
- Foss, Sonja K., Cindy L. Griffin, and Karen A. Foss. "Transforming Rhetoric Through Feminist Reconstruction: A Response to the Gender Diversity Perspective." Women's Studies in Communication 20 (Fall 1997): 117–35.
- Foss, Sonja K. "Re-Sourcement as Emancipation: A Case Study of Ritualized Sewing." Women's Studies in Communication 19 (Spring 1996): 63–84.
- Chryslee, Gail J., Sonja K. Foss, and Arthur L. Ranney. "The Construction of Claims in Visual Argumentation: An Exploration." Visual Communication Quarterly 3 (Spring 1996): 9–13.
- Foss, Sonja K., and Cindy L. Griffin. "Beyond Persuasion: A Proposal for an Invitational Rhetoric." Communication Monographs 62 (March 1995): 2–18.
- Foss, Sonja K. "A Rhetorical Schema for the Evaluation of Visual Imagery." Communication Studies 45 (Fall-Winter 1994): 213–24.
- Foss, Sonja K., and Karen A. Foss. "The Construction of Feminine Spectatorship in Garrison Keillor's Radio Monologues." Quarterly Journal of Speech 80 (November 1994): 410–26.
- Foss, Karen A., and Sonja K. Foss. "Personal Experience as Evidence in Feminist Scholarship." Western Journal of Communication 58 (Winter 1994): 39–43.
- Foss, Sonja K. "Revisioning the Public Speaking Course." Women's Studies in Communication 15 (Fall 1992): 53–65.
- Foss, Sonja K., and Cindy L. Griffin. "A Feminist Perspective on Rhetorical Theory: Toward a Clarification of Boundaries." Western Journal of Communication 56 (Fall 1992): 330–49.
- Foss, Sonja K., and Karen A. Foss. "What Distinguishes Feminist Scholarship in Communication Studies?" Women's Studies in Communication 11 (Spring 1988): 9–11.
- Foss, Sonja K. "Body Art: Insanity as Communication." Central States Speech Journal 38 (Summer 1987): 122–31.
- Foss, Sonja K. "Ambiguity as Persuasion: The Vietnam Veterans Memorial." Communication Quarterly 34 (Summer 1986): 326–40.
- Foss, Karen A., and Sonja K. Foss. "The Status of Research on Women and Communication." Communication Quarterly 31 (Summer 1983): 195–204.
- Foss, Sonja K. "Criteria for Adequacy in Rhetorical Criticism." Southern Speech Communication Journal, 33 (Spring 1983): 283–95.
- Foss, Sonja K. "Women Priests in the Episcopal Church: A Cluster Analysis of Opposition Rhetoric." Religious Communication Today 7 (September 1984): 1–11.
- Foss, Sonja K. "The Equal Rights Amendment Controversy: Rhetorical Worlds in Conflict." Quarterly Journal of Speech 65 (October 1979): 275–88.

=== Book chapters ===
- Foss, Sonja K., and William Waters. "Completing a Thesis/Dissertation: Transitioning from Reporter to Scholar." In Getting the Most from Your Graduate Education: A Student's Handbook, edited by Sherwyn Morreale and Pat Arneson, 97–108. Washington, D.C.: National Communication Association, 2008.
- Foss, Karen A., and Sonja K. Foss. "Accomplishing the Mission: Creating a Partnership With Your Advisor." In Getting the Most from Your Graduate Education: A Student's Handbook, edited by Sherwyn Morreale and Pat Arneson, 59–70. Washington, D.C.: National Communication Association, 2008.
- Foss, Sonja K. "Theory of Visual Rhetoric." In Handbook of Visual Communication: Theory, Methods, and Media, edited by Ken Smith, Sandra Moriarty, Gretchen Barbatsis, and Keith Kenney, 141–52. Mahwah, NJ: Lawrence Erlbaum, 2005.
- Foss, Sonja K. "Framing the Study of Visual Rhetoric: Toward a Transformation of Rhetorical Theory." In Defining Visual Rhetorics, edited by Charles A. Hill and Marguerite Helmers, 303–13. Mahwah, NJ: Lawrence Erlbaum, 2004.
- Foss, Sonja K. "Pauli Murray." In The Rhetoric of American Women: Critical Studies and Sources, edited by Karlyn Kohrs Campbell, 319–30. Westport, CT: Greenwood, 1994.
- Foss, Sonja K. "The Construction of Appeal in Visual Images: A Hypothesis." In Rhetorical Movement: Studies in Honor of Leland M. Griffin, edited by David Zarefsky, 211–25. Evanston, IL: Northwestern University Press, 1993.
- Foss, Sonja K. "Constituted by Agency: The Discourse and Practice of Rhetorical Criticism." In Essays to Commemorate the 75th Anniversary of The Speech Communication Association, edited by Gerald M. Phillips and Julia T. Wood, 33–51. Carbondale: Southern Illinois University Press, 1990.
- Foss, Karen A., and Sonja K. Foss. "Incorporating the Feminist Perspective in Communication Scholarship: A Research Commentary." In Doing Research on Women's Communication: Alternative Perspectives in Theory and Method, edited by Carole Spitzack and Kathryn Carter, 65–91. Norwood, NJ: Ablex, 1989.
- Foss, Sonja K. "Judy Chicago's The Dinner Party: Empowerment of Women's Voice in Visual Art." In Women Communicating: Studies of Women's Talk, edited by Barbara Bate and Anita Taylor, 9-26. Norwood, NJ: Ablex, 1988.

== See also ==
- Feminism
- Rhetorical criticism
- Rhetoric
