= Interpersonal communication =

Exchange of information among people

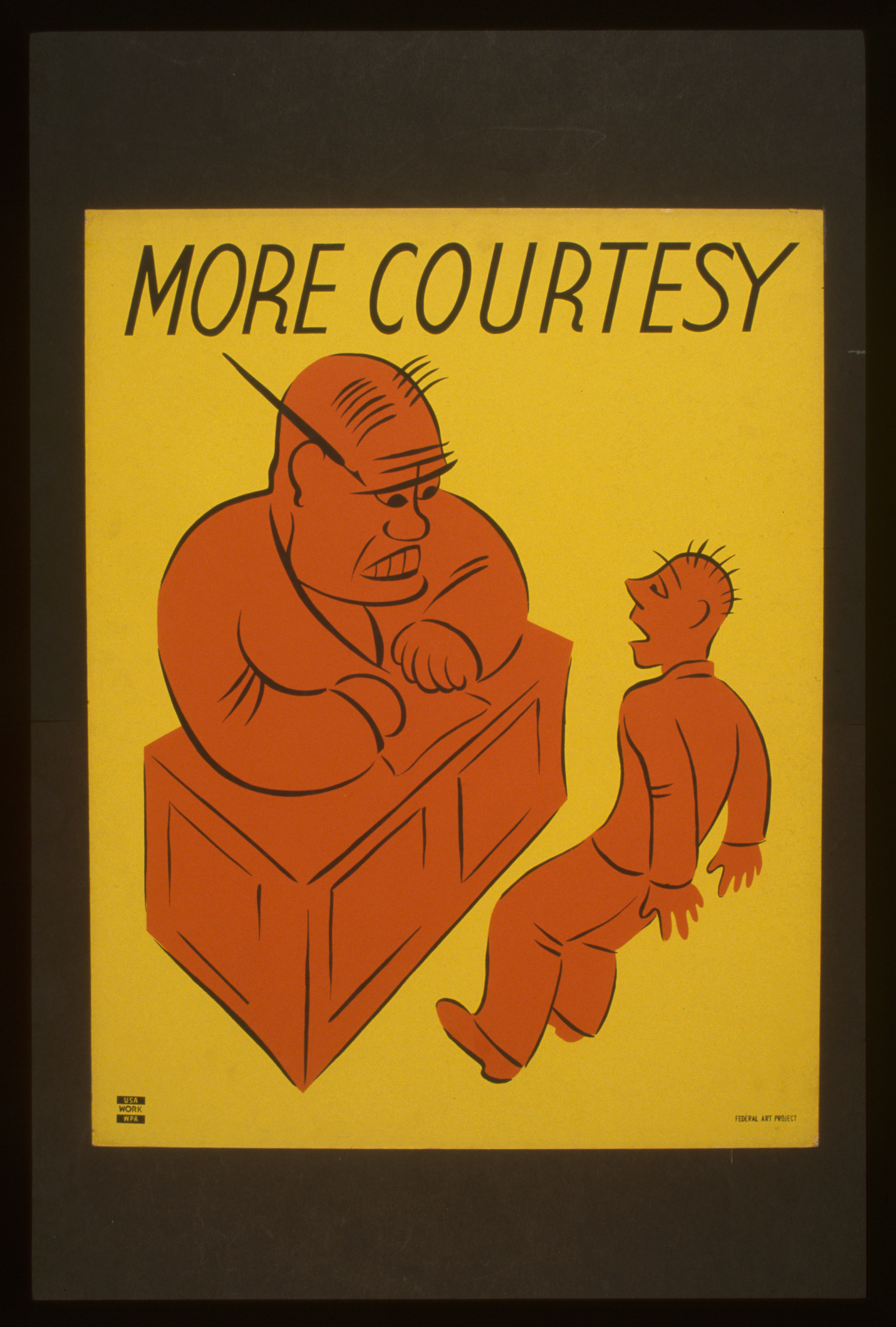
Poster promoting better interpersonal communication in the workplace, late 1930s–early 1940s (Work Projects Administration Poster Collection, Library of Congress)

Interpersonal communication is an exchange of information between two or more people. It is also an area of research that seeks to understand how humans use verbal and nonverbal cues to accomplish several personal and relational goals. Communication includes utilizing communication skills within one's surroundings, including physical and psychological spaces. It is essential to see the visual/nonverbal and verbal cues regarding the physical spaces. In the psychological spaces, self-awareness and awareness of the emotions, cultures, and things that are not seen are also significant when communicating.

Interpersonal communication research addresses at least six categories of inquiry: 1) how humans adjust and adapt their verbal communication and nonverbal communication during face-to-face communication; 2) how messages are produced; 3) how uncertainty influences behavior and information-management strategies; 4) deceptive communication; 5) relational dialectics; and 6) social interactions that are mediated by technology.

There is considerable variety in how this area of study is conceptually and operationally defined. Researchers in interpersonal communication come from many different research paradigms and theoretical traditions, adding to the complexity of the field. Interpersonal communication is often defined as communication that takes place between people who are interdependent and have some knowledge of each other: for example, communication between a son and his father, an employer and an employee, two sisters, a teacher and a student, two lovers, two friends, and so on.

Although interpersonal communication is most often between larger groups of people, it can also be extended to include small intimate groups such as the family. Interpersonal communication can take place in face-to-face settings, as well as through platforms such as social media. The study of interpersonal communication addresses a variety of elements and uses both quantitative/social scientific methods and qualitative methods.

There is growing interest in biological and physiological perspectives on interpersonal communication. Some of the concepts explored include personality, knowledge structures and social interaction, language, nonverbal signals, emotional experiences and expressions, supportive communication, social networks and the development of relationships, influence, conflict, computer-mediated communication, interpersonal skills, interpersonal communication in the workplace, intercultural perspectives on interpersonal communication, the escalation and de-escalation of romantic or platonic relationships, family relationships, and communication across the lifespan. Factors such as one's self-concept and perceptions also influence how individuals choose to communicate. In addition, factors such as gender and culture can affect interpersonal communication.

== History ==
The detailed study of interpersonal communication dates back to the 1970s and was formalized based on aspects of communication that preceded it. Aspects of communication such as rhetoric, persuasion, and dialogue have become a part of interpersonal communication. As writing and language styles developed, humans found ways to transfer messages. Interpersonal communication was one such way. In a world where technologies were not available to communicate, humans used pictures and carvings, which later developed into words and expressions. Interpersonal communication is now seen in a more dyadic way; finding face-to-face interaction as a more distinct form. The dynamics of interpersonal communication began to shift at the break of the Industrial Revolution. The evolution of interpersonal communication is multifaceted and aligns with technological advancements, societal changes, and theories.

Traditionally, interpersonal communication is grounded in face-to-face communication between people. As technology changed, the interpersonal communication style adapted from face-to-face interaction to a mediated component. The tools added over the years include the telegraph, telephone, and several media sites facilitating communication. Later in the article, the impacts of media on interpersonal communication are discussed. Interpersonal communication over the years has been aimed at forming relationships and ending relationships. The world has become more reliant on a mediated form of communication, which in turn has become a part of interpersonal communication as it has become an avenue in which most humans have decided to communicate. While this form is not traditional to interpersonal communication, it does fit the cities within the definition of interpersonal communication, which is the exchange between two or more people.

== Foundation of interpersonal communication ==
=== Interpersonal communication process principles ===
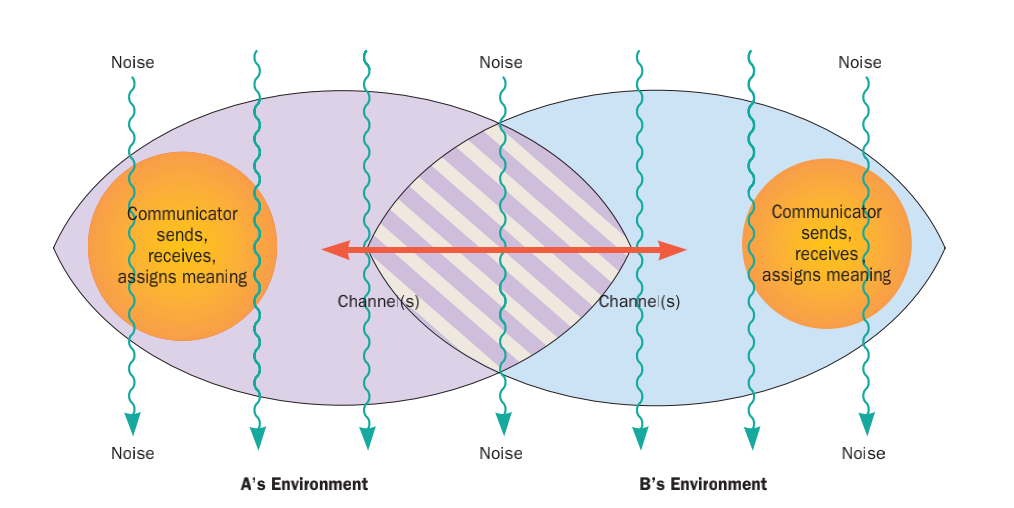

Human communication is a complex process with many components. And there are principles of communication that guide our understanding of communication.

==== Communication is transactional ====
Communication is a transactional communication—that is, a dynamic process created by the participants through their interaction with each other. In short, communication is an interactive process in which both parties need to participate. A metaphor is dancing. It is more like a process in which you and your partner are constantly running in and working together. Two perfect dancers do not necessarily guarantee the absolute success of a dance, but the perfect cooperation of two not-so-excellent dancers can guarantee a successful dance.

==== Communication can be intentional and unintentional ====
Some communication is intentional and deliberate. For example, before asking your boss for a promotion or a raise, you may spend a lot of time mentally preparing and practicing what you will say so that the conversation does not cause embarrassment. At the same time, communication can also be unintentional. For example, you may be complaining about an unfortunate experience you had that day in a corner of the school, and your friend may happen to overhear your complaint. Even if you do not want others to know about your experience, you may unintentionally communicate the message to them. In this way, unintentional communication can also convey information and create meaning.

==== Communication Is Irreversible ====
The process of Interpersonal Communication is irreversible, you can wish you had not said something and you can apologise for something you said and later regret - but you can not take it back.

==== Communication Is Unrepeatable ====
Unrepeatability arises from the fact that an act of communication can never be duplicated The reason is that the audience may be different, our mood at the time may be different, or our relationship may be in a different place. In person communication can be invigorating and is often memorable when people are engaged and in the moment.

== Theories ==
=== Uncertainty reduction theory ===
Uncertainty reduction theory, developed in 1975, comes from the socio-psychological perspective. It addresses the basic process of how we gain knowledge about other people. According to the theory, people have difficulty with uncertainty. You are not sure what is going to come next, so you are uncertain how you should prepare for the upcoming event. To help predict behavior, they are motivated to seek information about the people with whom they interact.

The theory argues that strangers, upon meeting, go through specific steps and checkpoints in order to reduce uncertainty about each other and form an idea of whether they like or dislike each other. During communication, individuals are making plans to accomplish their goals. At highly uncertain moments, they will become more vigilant and rely more on data available in the situation. A reduction in certainty leads to a loss of confidence in the initial plan, such that the individual may make contingency plans. The theory also says that higher levels of uncertainty create distance between people and that non-verbal expressiveness tends to help reduce uncertainty.

The constructs of the theory include the level of uncertainty, the nature of the relationship, and the ways in which uncertainty can be reduced. The underlying assumptions include the idea that individuals cognitively process the existence of uncertainty and take steps to reduce it. The boundary conditions of this theory are that there must be some kind of trigger, usually arising from a social situation, that initiates an internal cognitive process.

According to the theory, we reduce uncertainty in three ways:

1. Passive strategies: observing the person.
2. Active strategies: asking others about the person or looking up information
3. Interactive strategies: asking questions, self-disclosure.

Uncertainty reduction theory is most applicable to the initial interaction context. Scholars have extended the uncertainty framework with theories that describe uncertainty management and motivated information management. These extended theories give a broader conceptualization of how uncertainty operates in interpersonal communication as well as how uncertainty motivates individuals to seek information. The theory has also been applied to romantic relationships.

=== Social exchange theory ===
Social exchange theory falls under the symbolic interaction perspective. The theory describes, explains, and predicts when and why people reveal certain information about themselves to others. The social exchange theory uses Thibaut and Kelley's (1959) theory of interdependence. This theory states that "relationships grow, develop, deteriorate, and dissolve as a consequence of an unfolding social-exchange process, which may be conceived as a bartering of rewards and costs both between the partners and between members of the partnership and others". Social exchange theory argues that the major force in interpersonal relationships is the satisfaction of both people's self-interest.

According to the theory, human interaction is analogous to an economic transaction, in that an individual may seek to maximize rewards and minimize costs. Actions such as revealing information about oneself will occur when the cost-reward ratio is acceptable. As long as rewards continue to outweigh costs, a pair of individuals will become increasingly intimate by sharing more and more personal information. The constructs of this theory include disclosure, relational expectations, and perceived rewards or costs in the relationship. In the context of marriage, the rewards within the relationship include emotional security and sexual fulfillment. Based on this theory Levinger argued that marriages will fail when the rewards of the relationship lessen, the barriers against leaving the spouse are weak, and the alternatives outside of the relationship are appealing.

=== Symbolic interaction ===
Symbolic interaction comes from the socio-cultural perspective in that it relies on the creation of shared meaning through interactions with others. This theory focuses on the ways in which people form meaning and structure in society through interactions. People are motivated to act based on the meanings they assign to people, things, and events.

Symbolic interaction considers the world to be made up of social objects that are named and have socially determined meanings. When people interact over time, they come to shared meaning for certain terms and actions and thus come to understand events in particular ways. There are three main concepts in this theory: society, self, and mind.

Society
Social acts (which create meaning) involve an initial gesture from one individual, a response to that gesture from another, and a result.
Self
Self-image comes from interaction with others. A person makes sense of the world and defines their "self" through social interactions that indicate the value of the self.
Mind
The ability to use significant symbols makes thinking possible. One defines objects in terms of how one might react to them.

Constructs for this theory include creation of meaning, social norms, human interactions, and signs and symbols. An underlying assumption for this theory is that meaning and social reality are shaped from interactions with others and that some kind of shared meaning is reached. For this to be effective, there must be numerous people communicating and interacting and thus assigning meaning to situations or objects.

=== Relational dialectics theory ===
The dialectical approach to interpersonal communication revolves around the notions of contradiction, change, praxis, and totality, with influences from Hegel, Marx, and Bakhtin. The dialectical approach searches for understanding by exploring the tension of opposing arguments. Both internal and external dialectics function in interpersonal relationships, including separateness vs. connection, novelty vs. predictability, and openness vs. closedness.

Relational dialectics theory deals with how meaning emerges from the interplay of competing discourses. A discourse is a system of meaning that helps us to understand the underlying sense of a particular utterance. Communication between two parties invokes multiple systems of meaning that are in tension with each other. Relational dialectics theory argues that these tensions are both inevitable and necessary. The meanings intended in our conversations may be interpreted, understood, or misunderstood. In this theory, all discourse, including internal discourse, has competing properties that relational dialectics theory aims to analyze.

==== The three relational dialectics ====
Relational dialectics theory assumes three different types of tensions in relationships: connectedness vs. separateness, certainty vs. uncertainty, and openness vs. closedness.

==== Connectedness vs. separateness ====
Most individuals naturally desire that their interpersonal relationships involve close connections. However, relational dialectics theory argues that no relationship can be enduring unless the individuals involved within it have opportunities to be alone. An excessive reliance on a specific relationship can result in the loss of individual identity.

==== Certainty vs. uncertainty ====
Individuals desire a sense of assurance and predictability in their interpersonal relationships. However, they also desire variety, spontaneity and mystery in their relationships. Like repetitive work, relationships that become bland and monotonous are undesirable.

==== Openness vs. closedness ====
In close interpersonal relationships, individuals may feel a pressure to reveal personal information, as described in social penetration theory. This pressure may be opposed by a natural desire to retain some level of personal privacy.

=== Coordinated management of meaning ===
The coordinated management of meaning theory assumes that two individuals engaging in an interaction each construct their own interpretation and perception of what a conversation means, then negotiate a common meaning by coordinating with each other. This coordination involves the individuals establishing rules for creating and interpreting meaning.

The rules that individuals can apply in any communicative situation include constitutive and regulative rules.

Constitutive rules are "rules of meaning used by communicators to interpret or understand an event or message".

Regulative rules are "rules of action used to determine how to respond or behave".

When one individual sends a message to the other the recipient must interpret the meaning of the interaction. Often, this can be done almost instantaneously because the interpretation rules that apply to the situation are immediate and simple. However, there are times when the interpretation of the 'rules' for an interaction is not obvious. This depends on each communicator's previous beliefs and perceptions within a given context and how they can apply these rules to the current interaction. These "rules" of meaning "are always chosen within a context", and the context of a situation can be used as a framework for interpreting specific events. Contexts that an individual can refer to when interpreting a communicative event include the relationship context, the episode context, the self-concept context, and the archetype context.

Relationship context
This context assumes that there are mutual expectations between individuals who are members of a group.
Episode context
This context refers to a specific event in which the communicative act is taking place.
Self-concept context
This context involves one's sense of self, or an individual's personal 'definition' of him/herself.
Archetype context
This context is essentially one's image of what his or her belief consists of regarding general truths within communicative exchanges.

Pearce and Cronen argue that these specific contexts exist in a hierarchical fashion. This theory assumes that the bottom level of this hierarchy consists of the communicative act. The relationship context is next in the hierarchy, then the episode context, followed by the self-concept context, and finally the archetype context.

=== Social penetration theory ===
Social penetration theory is a conceptual framework that describes the development of interpersonal relationships. This theory refers to the reciprocity of behaviors between two people who are in the process of developing a relationship. These behaviors can include verbal/nonverbal exchange, interpersonal perceptions, and interactions with the environment. The behaviors vary based on the different levels of intimacy in the relationship.

"Onion theory"

This theory is often known as the "onion theory". This analogy suggests that like an onion, personalities have "layers". The outside layer is what the public sees, and the core is one's private self. When a relationship begins to develop, the individuals in the relationship may undergo a process of self-disclosure, progressing more deeply into the "layers".

Social penetration theory recognizes five stages: orientation, exploratory affective exchange, affective exchange, stable exchange, and de-penetration. Not all of these stages happen in every relationship.

1. Orientation stage: strangers exchange only impersonal information and are very cautious in their interactions.
2. Exploratory affective stage: communication styles become somewhat more friendly and relaxed.
3. Affective exchange: there is a high amount of open communication between individuals. These relationships typically consist of close friends or even romantic or platonic partners.
4. Stable exchange: continued open and personal types of interaction.
5. De-penetration: when the relationship's costs exceed its benefits there may be a withdrawal of information, ultimately leading to the end of the relationship.

If the early stages take place too quickly, this may be negative for the progress of the relationship.

Example: Jenny and Justin met for the first time at a wedding. Within minutes Jenny starts to tell Justin about her terrible ex-boyfriend and the misery he put her through. This is information that is typically shared at stage three or four, not stage one. Justin finds this off-putting, reducing the chances of a future relationship.

Social penetration theory predicts that people decide to risk self-disclosure based on the costs and rewards of sharing information, which are affected by factors such as relational outcome, relational stability, and relational satisfaction.

The depth of penetration is the degree of intimacy a relationship has accomplished, measured relative to the stages above. Griffin defines depth as "the degree of disclosure in a specific area of an individual's life" and breadth as "the range of areas in an individual's life over which disclosure takes place."

The theory explains the following key observations:

1. Peripheral items are exchanged more frequently and sooner than private information;
2. Self-disclosure is reciprocal, especially in the early stages of relationship development;
3. Penetration is rapid at the start but slows down quickly as the tightly wrapped inner layers are reached;
4. De-penetration is a gradual process of layer-by-layer withdrawal.

Computer-mediated social penetration

Online communication seems to follow a different set of rules. Because much online communication occurs on an anonymous level, individuals have the freedom to forego the 'rules' of self disclosure. In on-line interactions personal information can be disclosed immediately and without the risk of excessive intimacy. For example, Facebook users post extensive personal information, pictures, information on hobbies, and messages. This may be due to the heightened level of perceived control within the context of the online communication medium.

=== Relational patterns of interaction theory ===
Paul Watzlawick's theory of communication, popularly known as the "Interactional View", interprets relational patterns of interaction in the context of five "axioms". The theory draws on the cybernetic tradition. Watzlawick, his mentor Gregory Bateson and the members of the Mental Research Institute in Palo Alto were known as the Palo Alto Group. Their work was highly influential in laying the groundwork for family therapy and the study of relationships.

==== Ubiquitous communication ====
The theory states that a person's presence alone results in them, consciously or not, expressing things about themselves and their relationships with others (i.e., communicating). A person cannot avoid interacting, and even if they do, their avoidance may be read as a statement by others. This ubiquitous interaction leads to the establishment of "expectations" and "patterns" which are used to determine and explain relationship types.

==== Expectations ====
Individuals enter communication with others having established expectations for their own behavior as well as the behavior of those they are communicating with. During the interaction these expectations may be reinforced, or new expectations may be established that will be used in future interactions. New expectations are created by new patterns of interaction, while reinforcement results from the continuation of established patterns of interaction.

==== Patterns of interaction ====
Established patterns of interaction are created when a trend occurs regarding how two people interact with each other. There are two patterns of particular importance to the theory. In symmetrical relationships, the pattern of interaction is defined by two people responding to one another in the same way. This is a common pattern of interaction within power struggles. In complementary relationships, the participants respond to one another in opposing ways. An example of such a relationship would be when one person is argumentative while the other is quiet.

===== Relational control =====
Relational control refers to who is in control within a relationship. The pattern of behavior between partners over time, not any individual's behavior, defines the control within a relationship. Patterns of behavior involve individuals' responses to others' assertions.

There are three kinds of responses:

- One-down responses are submissive to, or accepting of, another's assertions.
- One-up responses are in opposition to, or counter, another's assertions.
- One-across responses are neutral in nature.

==== Complementary exchanges ====
A complementary exchange occurs when a partner asserts a one-up message which the other partner responds to with a one-down response. If complementary exchanges are frequent within a relationship it is likely that the relationship itself is complementary.

==== Symmetrical exchanges ====
Symmetrical exchanges occur when one partner's assertion is countered with a reflective response: a one-up assertion is met with a one-up response, or a one-down assertion is met with a one-down response. If symmetrical exchanges are frequent within a relationship it is likely that the relationship is also symmetrical.

Applications of relational control include analysis of family interactions, and also the analysis of interactions such as those between teachers and students.

=== Theory of intertype relationships ===
Socionics proposes a theory of relationships between psychological types (intertype relationships) based on a modified version of C.G. Jung's theory of psychological types. Communication between types is described using the concept of information metabolism proposed by Antoni Kępiński. Socionics defines 16 types of relations, ranging from the most attractive and comfortable to disputed. This analysis gives insight into some features of interpersonal relations, including aspects of psychological and sexual compatibility, and ranks as one of the four most popular models of personality.

=== Identity management theory ===
Falling under the socio-cultural tradition, identity-management theory explains the establishment, development, and maintenance of identities within relationships, as well as changes to identities within relationships.

==== Establishing identities ====
People establish their identities (or faces), and their partners, through a process referred to as "facework". Everyone has a desired identity which they are constantly working towards establishing. This desired identity can be both threatened and supported by attempts to negotiate a relational identity (the identity one shares with one's partner). Thus, a person's desired identity is directly influenced by their relationships, and their relational identity by their desired individual identity.

==== Cultural influence ====
Identity management pays significant attention to intercultural relationships and how they affect the relational and individual identities of those involved, especially the different ways in which partners of different cultures negotiate with each other in an effort to satisfy desires for adequate autonomous identities and relational identities. Tensions within intercultural relationships can include stereotyping, or "identity freezing", and "nonsupport".

==== Relational stages of identity management ====
Identity management is an ongoing process that Imahori and Cupach define as having three relational stages. The trial stage occurs at the beginning of an intercultural relationship when partners are beginning to explore their cultural differences. During this stage, each partner is attempting to determine what cultural identities they want in the relationship. At the trial stage, cultural differences are significant barriers to the relationship and it is critical for partners to avoid identity freezing and nonsupport. During this stage, individuals are more willing to risk face threats to establish a balance necessary for the relationship. The enmeshment stage occurs when a relational identity emerges with established common cultural features. During this stage, the couple becomes more comfortable with their collective identity and the relationship in general. In the renegotiation stage, couples work through identity issues and draw on their past relational history while doing so. A strong relational identity has been established by this stage and couples have mastered dealing with cultural differences. It is at this stage that cultural differences become part of the relationship rather than a tension within it.

=== Communication privacy management theory ===
Communication privacy management theory, from the socio-cultural tradition, is concerned with how people negotiate openness and privacy in relation to communicated information. This theory focuses on how people in relationships manage boundaries which separate the public from the private.

==== Boundaries ====
An individual's private information is protected by the individual's boundaries. The permeability of these boundaries is ever changing, allowing selective access to certain pieces of information. This sharing occurs when the individual has weighed their need to share the information against their need to protect themselves. This risk assessment is used by couples when evaluating their relationship boundaries. The disclosure of private information to a partner may result in greater intimacy, but it may also result in the discloser becoming more vulnerable.

==== Co-ownership of information ====
When someone chooses to reveal private information to another person, they are making that person a co-owner of the information. Co-ownership comes with rules, responsibilities, and rights that must be negotiated between the discloser of the information and the receiver of it. The rules might cover questions such as: Can the information be disclosed? When can the information be disclosed? To whom can the information be disclosed? And how much of the information can be disclosed? The negotiation of these rules can be complex, and the rules can be explicit as well as implicit; rules may also be violated.

==== Boundary turbulence ====
What Petronio refers to as "boundary turbulence" occurs when rules are not mutually understood by co-owners, and when a co-owner of information deliberately violates the rules. This is not uncommon and usually results in some kind of conflict. It often results in one party becoming more apprehensive about future revelations of information to the violator.

=== Cognitive dissonance theory ===
The theory of cognitive dissonance, part of the cybernetic tradition, argues that humans are consistency seekers and attempt to reduce their dissonance, or cognitive discomfort. The theory was developed in the 1950s by Leon Festinger.

The theory holds that when individuals encounter new information or new experiences, they categorize the information based on their preexisting attitudes, thoughts, and beliefs. If the new encounter does not fit their preexisting assumptions, then dissonance is likely to occur. Individuals are then motivated to reduce the dissonance they experience by avoiding situations that generate dissonance. For this reason, cognitive dissonance is considered a drive state that generates motivation to achieve consonance and reduce dissonance.

An example of cognitive dissonance would be if someone holds the belief that maintaining a healthy lifestyle is important, but maintains a sedentary lifestyle and eats unhealthy food. They may experience dissonance between their beliefs and their actions. If there is a significant amount of dissonance, they may be motivated to work out more or eat healthier foods. They may also be inclined to avoid situations that bring them face to face with the fact that their attitudes and beliefs are inconsistent, by avoiding the gym and avoiding stepping on their weighing scale.

To avoid dissonance, individuals may select their experiences in several ways: selective exposure, i.e. seeking only information that is consonant with one's current beliefs, thoughts, or actions; selective attention, i.e. paying attention only to information that is consonant with one's beliefs; selective interpretation, i.e. interpreting ambiguous information in a way that seems consistent with one's beliefs; and selective retention, i.e. remembering only information that is consistent with one's beliefs.

==== Types of cognitive relationships ====
According to cognitive dissonance theory, there are three types of cognitive relationships: consonant relationships, dissonant relationships, and irrelevant relationships. Consonant relationships are when two elements, such as beliefs and actions, are in equilibrium with each other or coincide. Dissonant relationships are when two elements are not in equilibrium and cause dissonance. In irrelevant relationships, the two elements do not possess a meaningful relationship with one another.

=== Attribution theory ===
Attribution theory is part of the socio-psychological tradition and analyzes how individuals make inferences about observed behavior. Attribution theory assumes that we make attributions, or social judgments, as a way to clarify or predict behavior.

==== Steps to the attribution process ====
1. Observe the behavior or action.
2. Make judgments about the intention of a particular action.
3. Make an attribution of cause, which may be internal (i.e. the cause is related to the person), or external (i.e. the cause of the action is external circumstances).

For example, when a student fails a test an observer may choose to attribute that action to 'internal' causes, such as insufficient study, laziness, or having a poor work ethic. Alternatively the action might be attributed to 'external' factors such as the difficulty of the test, or real-world stressors that led to distraction.

Individuals also make attributions about their own behavior. The student who received a failing test score might make an internal attribution, such as "I just can't understand this material", or an external attribution, such as "this test was just too difficult."

==== Fundamental attribution error and actor-observer bias ====
Observers making attributions about the behavior of others may overemphasize internal attributions and underestimate external attributions; this is known as the fundamental attribution error. Conversely, when an individual makes an attribution about their own behavior they may overestimate external attributions and underestimate internal attributions. This is called actor-observer bias.

=== Expectancy violations theory ===
Expectancy violations theory is part of the socio-psychological tradition, and addresses the relationship between non-verbal message production and the interpretations people hold for those non-verbal behaviors. Individuals hold certain expectations for non-verbal behavior that are based on social norms, past experience and situational aspects of that behavior. When expectations are either met or violated, we make assumptions about the behaviors and judge them to be positive or negative.

==== Arousal ====
When a deviation of expectations occurs, there is an increased interest in the situation, also known as arousal. This may be either cognitive arousal, an increased mental awareness of expectancy deviations, or physical arousal, resulting in body actions and behaviors as a result of expectancy deviations.

==== Reward valence ====
When an expectation is not met, an individual may view the violation of expectations either positively or negatively, depending on their relationship to the violator and their feelings about the outcome.

==== Proxemics ====
One type of violation of expectations is the violation of the expectation of personal space. The study of proxemics focuses on the use of space to communicate. Edward T. Hall's (1940-2017) theory of personal space defined four zones that carry different messages in the U.S.:

- Intimate distance (0–18 inches). This is reserved for intimate relationships with significant others, or the parent-child relationship (hugging, cuddling, kisses, etc.)
- Personal distance (18–48 inches). This is appropriate for close friends and acquaintances, such as significant others and close friends, e.g. sitting close to a friend or family member on the couch.
- Social distance (4–10 feet). This is appropriate for new acquaintances and for professional situations, such as interviews and meetings.
- Public distance (10 feet or more). This is appropriate for a public setting, such as a public street or a park.

=== Pedagogical communication ===
Pedagogical communication is a form of interpersonal communication that involves both verbal and nonverbal components. A teacher's nonverbal immediacy, clarity, and socio-communicative style has significant consequences for students' affective and cognitive learning.

It has been argued that "companionship" is a useful metaphor for the role of "immediacy", the perception of physical, emotional, or psychological proximity created by positive communicative behaviors, in pedagogy.

=== Social networks ===
A social network is made up of a set of individuals (or organizations) and the links among them. For example, each individual may be treated as a node, and each connection due to friendship or other relationship is treated as a link. Links may be weighted by the content or frequency of interactions or the overall strength of the relationship. This treatment allows patterns or structures within the network to be identified and analyzed, and shifts the focus of interpersonal communication research from solely analyzing dyadic relationships to analyzing larger networks of connections among communicators. Instead of describing the personalities and communication qualities of an individual, individuals are described in terms of their relative location within a larger social network structure. Such structures both create and reflect a wide range of social phenomena.

=== Hurt ===
Interpersonal communications can lead to hurt in relationships. Categories of hurt include devaluation, relational transgressions, and hurtful communication.

==== Devaluation ====
A person can feel devalued at the individual and relational level. Individuals can feel devalued when someone insults their intelligence, appearance, personality, or life decisions. At the relational level, individuals can feel devalued when they believe that their partner does not perceive the relationship to be close, important, or valuable.

==== Relational transgressions ====
Relational transgressions occur when individuals violate implicit or explicit relational rules. For instance, if the relationship is conducted on the assumption of sexual and emotional fidelity, violating this standard represents a relational transgression. Infidelity is a form of hurt that can have particularly strong negative effects on relationships. The method by which the infidelity is discovered influences the degree of hurt: witnessing the partner's infidelity first hand is most likely to destroy the relationship, while partners who confess on their own are most likely to be forgiven.

==== Hurtful communication ====
Hurtful communication is communication that inflicts psychological pain. According to Vangelisti (1994), words "have the ability to hurt or harm in every bit as real a way as physical objects. A few ill-spoken words (e.g. "You're worthless", "You'll never amount to anything", "I don't love you anymore") can strongly affect individuals, interactions, and relationships."

=== Interpersonal conflict ===
Many interpersonal communication scholars have sought to define and understand interpersonal conflict, using varied definitions of conflict. In 2004, Barki and Hartwick consolidated several definitions across the discipline and defined conflict as "a dynamic process that occurs between interdependent parties as they experience negative emotional reactions to perceived disagreements and interference with the attainment of their goals". They note three properties generally associated with conflict situations: disagreement, negative emotion, and interference.

In the context of an organization, there are two targets of conflicts: tasks, or interpersonal relationships. Conflicts over events, plans, behaviors, etc. are task issues, while conflict in relationships involves dispute over issues such as attitudes, values, beliefs, behaviors, or relationship status.

=== Technology and interpersonal communication skills ===
Technologies such as email, text messaging and social media have added a new dimension to interpersonal communication. There are increasing claims that over-reliance on online communication affects the development of interpersonal communication skills, in particular nonverbal communication. Psychologists and communication experts argue that listening to and comprehending conversations plays a significant role in developing effective interpersonal communication skills.

=== Others ===
- Attachment theory. This theory follows the relationships that builds between a mother and child, and the impact it has on their relationships with others. It resulted from the combined work of John Bowlby and Mary Ainsworth (Ainsworth & Bowlby, 1991).
- Ethics in personal relations. This considers a space of mutual responsibility between two individuals, including giving and receiving in a relationship. This theory is explored by Dawn J. Lipthrott in the article "What IS Relationship? What is Ethical Partnership?"
- Deception in communication. This concept is based on the premise that everyone lies and considers how lying impacts relationships. James Hearn explores this theory in his article, "Interpersonal Deception Theory: Ten Lessons for Negotiators."
- Conflict in couples. This focuses on the impact that social media has on relationships, as well as how to communicate through conflict. This theory is explored by Amanda Lenhart and Maeve Duggan in their paper, "Couples, the Internet, and Social Media."

== Relevance to mass communication ==
Interpersonal communication has been studied as a mediator for information flow from mass media to the wider population. The two-step flow of communication theory proposes that most people form their opinions under the influence of opinion leaders, who in turn are influenced by the mass media. Many studies have repeated this logic in investigating the effects of personal and mass communication, for example in election campaigns and health-related information campaigns.

It is not clear whether or how social networking through sites such as Facebook changes this picture. Social networking is conducted over electronic devices with no face-to-face interaction, resulting in an inability to access the behavior of the communicator and the nonverbal signals that facilitate communication. Side effects of using these technologies for communication may not always be apparent to the individual user, and may involve both benefits and risks.

== Context ==
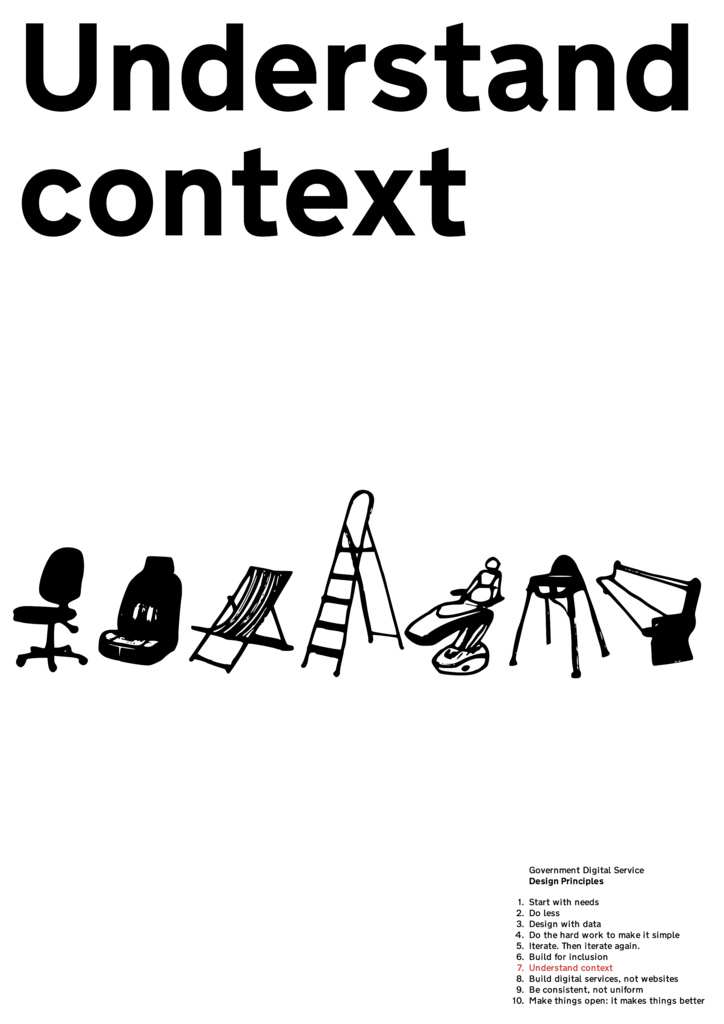
Understand the context of the situation so you can better execute the task

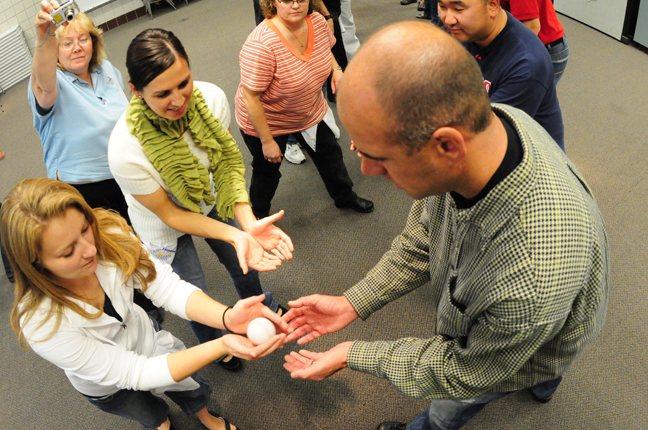
Understanding the context of a situation may lead to an awareness of necessary precautions.

Context refers to environmental factors that influence the outcomes of communication. These include time and place, as well as factors like family relationships, gender, culture, personal interest and the environment. Any given situation may involve many interacting contexts, including the retrospective context and the emergent context. The retrospective context is everything that comes before a particular behavior that might help understand and interpret that behavior, while the emergent context refers to relevant events that come after the behavior. Context can include all aspects of social channels and situational milieu, the cultural and linguistic backgrounds of the participants, and the developmental stage or maturity of the participants.

=== Situational milieu ===
Situational milieu can be defined as the combination of the social and physical environments in which something takes place. For example, a classroom, a military conflict, a supermarket checkout, and a hospital would be considered situational milieus. The season, weather, current physical location and environment are also milieus.

To understand the meaning of what is being communicated, context must be considered. Internal and external noise can have a profound effect on interpersonal communication. External noise consists of outside influences that distract from the communication. Internal noise is described as cognitive causes of interference in a communication transaction. In the hospital setting, for example, external noise can include the sound made by medical equipment or conversations had by team members outside of patient's rooms, and internal noise could be a health care professional's thoughts about other issues that distract them from the current conversation with a client.

Channels of communication also affect the effectiveness of interpersonal communication. Communication channels may be either synchronous or asynchronous. Synchronous communication takes place in real time, for example face-to-face discussions and telephone conversations. Asynchronous communications can be sent and received at different times, as with text messages and e-mails.

In a hospital environment, for example, urgent situations may require the immediacy of communication through synchronous channels. Benefits of synchronous communication include immediate message delivery, and fewer chances of misunderstandings and miscommunications. A disadvantage of synchronous communication is that it can be difficult to retain, recall, and organize the information that has been given in a verbal message, especially when copious amounts of data have been communicated in a short amount of time. Asynchronous messages can serve as reminders of what has been done and what needs to be done, which can prove beneficial in a fast-paced health care setting. However, the sender does not know when the other person will receive the message. When used appropriately, synchronous and asynchronous communication channels are both efficient ways to communicate. Mistakes in hospital contexts are often a result of communication problems.

=== Linguistic backgrounds ===
Linguistics is the study of language, and is divided into three broad aspects: the form of language, the meaning of language, and the context or function of language. Form refers to the words and sounds of language and how the words are used to make sentences. Meaning focuses on the significance of the words and sentences that human beings have put together. Function, or context, interprets the meaning of the words and sentences being said to understand why a person is communicating.

== Culture and Gender ==
=== Culture ===
Culture is a human concept that encompasses the beliefs, values, attitudes, and customs of groups of people. It is important in communication because of the help it provides in transmitting complex ideas, feelings, and specific situations from one person to another. Culture influences an individual's thoughts, feelings and actions, and therefore affects communication. The more difference there is between the cultural backgrounds of two people, the more different their styles of communication will be. Therefore, it is important to be aware of a person's background, ideas and beliefs and consider their social, economic and political positions before attempting to decode the message accurately and respond appropriately. Five major elements related to culture affect the communication process:

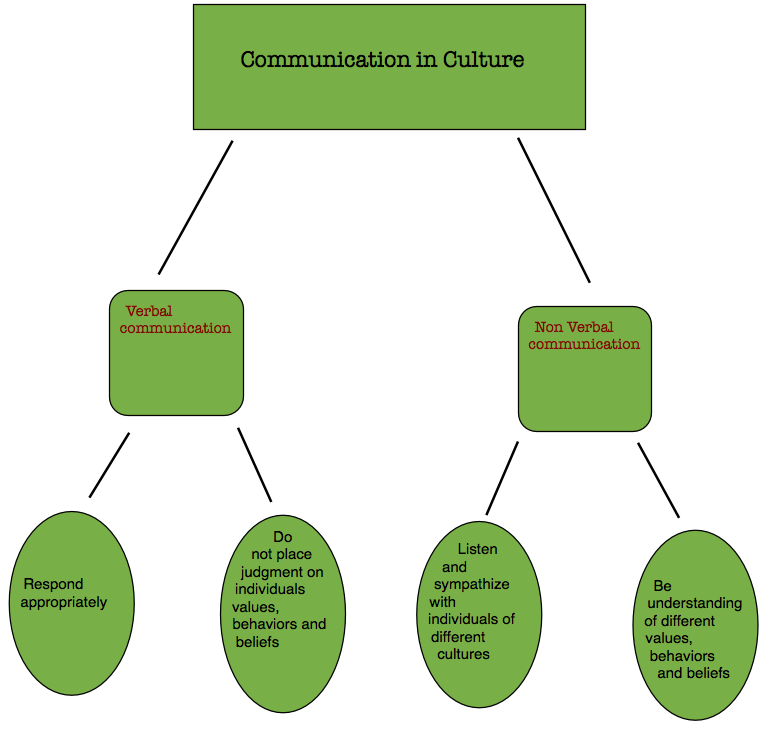
Communication diagram showing types of communication between cultures, including verbal and non-verbal communication

1. Cultural history
2. Religion
3. Value (personal and cultural)
4. Social organization
5. Language

Communication between cultures may occur through verbal communication or nonverbal communication. Culture influences verbal communication in a variety of ways, particularly by imposing language barriers. Each individual has their own languages, beliefs and values that must be considered. Factors influencing nonverbal communication include the different roles of eye contact in different cultures. Touching as a form of greeting may be perceived as impolite in some cultures, but normal in others. Acknowledging and understanding these cultural differences improves communication.

=== Gender ===
Gender is considered to be a socially and culturally constructed role assigned to an individual based on their perceived sex. Gender is the behavioral, cultural, or emotional traits typically associated with one's sex. These perceptions and roles humans are assigned and characterized by may impact the expectations of their interpersonal communication and how they choose to display themselves when communicating. How men or women may communicate can stem from how they have developed based on cultural and societal factors, as there are distinctive factors in which men and women are characterized. Society and culture have placed certain expectations on men and women about how they communicate. Society tends to place men in a more assertive and dominant role. This expectation of a dominant nature is also related to men being associated with a lack of emotions. Conversely, women are expected to be more empathic with their communication style to create relationships.

A crucial part of interpersonal communication is being able to talk and listen. Society expects men to communicate with a goal-oriented approach, which may negatively impact their effectiveness in active listening. At the same time, women are expected to be more supportive in their interactions. These suggested traits could be stereotypes or generalizations that exist. However, research has found that both diverge from and converge with these stereotypes and generalizations. A study of faculty members compares communication between male and female faculty members. The study found that male faculty were more talkative during the meetings and assertive when making their points. This study does diverge from the stereotype of women being considered the more talkative gender. At the same time, it converges with the generalization that men are more assertive when communicating.

Regardless of expectations, some people will reflect, and some will reshape the expectations to fit their social and family interactions as shifts in ideological and societal values change.

== Interpersonal Communication and Social Media ==
The rise of social media has impacted communication as a whole. In this age of technology, Communication intended to feel so personal can seem impersonal. Social media can significantly affect how interpersonal communication occurs. Several social media platforms aim to enhance our communication by escaping geographical barriers. Researchers have identified both positive and negative impacts of mediated forms of interpersonal communication:

- Misinterpretation: Without a physical face-to-face interaction, miscommunication can frequently occur when communicating through a mediated medium. Messages are sent verbally and non-verbally when using interpersonal communication—discerning one's attitudes when it is more complicated due to the lack of feedback and expressions. Facial expression, a vital part of interpersonal communication as a support for verbal communication, is replaced in this form and reflected through emojis, acronyms, etc. Most of the non-verbal aspects, such as eye contact and posture, cannot be seen through the mediated forum; hence, some feedback is lost regarding our interest level. Usually, when someone is making eye contact, it shows a level of interest in the meditated format. Individuals may instead look at the pacing of the reply to suggest interest, which now does not factor in that life continues to happen around them; hence, there could be several reasons why the lines of communication could affect and not just that they may not be interested which could lead to miscommunication in the future.
- Relationship Enhancements: There are different modalities in which humans have developed to communicate. Communication is critical to letting the communicator know how to respond to a message. It is foundational to understand and interpret how a message has been received. Social media does entail aspects of feedback, and we have worked in recent years to develop these forms of feedback through quick reply suggestions to keep the conversations going without a physical presence. Through this, social media has created an avenue in which people over extended geographical distances can still engage in interpersonal communication and continue the development of relationships.
- Decision Making: Research found that social media and interpersonal communication are equally likely to impact one's perceptions. Both social media and interpersonal communication impact decision-making. Interpersonal communication takes a more personal approach, which helps to evoke trust. Social media takes a more diverse approach to the information provided, and sources depend on interactions. Social media provides a medium to see several viewpoints at the same time. Having multiple perspectives helps individuals find or formulate their perception of what is true. It will also allow individuals the opportunity to voice their opinions. Conversely, in an interpersonal setting, the ability to voice an opinion or formulate a decision may be more challenging with a limited pool of information. A study into the impact of social media and interpersonal communication on one's environmental perceptions found that both could influence the perceptions equally, and people could link both social media as a form of reinforcement to interpersonal communication.

Social media acts as an avenue for interpersonal communication. Some aspects of the communication form are altered to fit the technological space and make the space feel as personal as possible.

=== Developmental Progress (maturity) ===
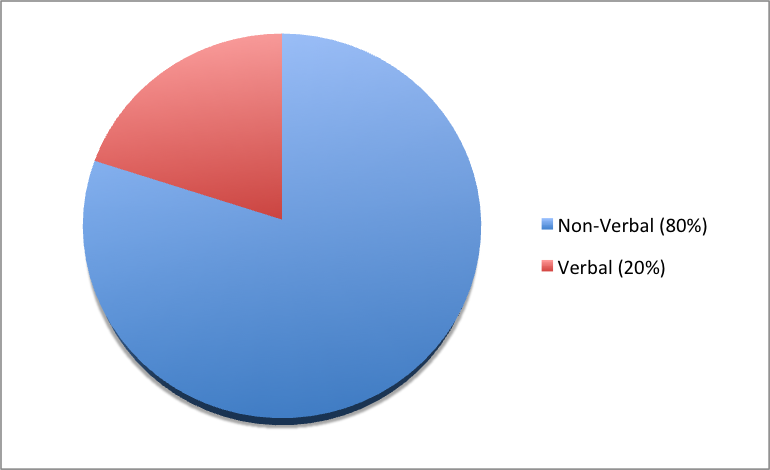
Pie chart of verbal (20%) and non-verbal (80%) communication in infants

Communication skills develop throughout one's lifetime. The majority of language development happens during infancy and early childhood. The attributes for each level of development can be used to improve communication with individuals of these ages.

== See also ==
- Coordinated Management of Meaning
- Criticism
- Decision downloading
- Face-to-face interaction
- Friedemann Schulz von Thun
- I-message
- Ishin-denshin
- Interpersonal relationship
- Nonviolent Communication
- Organizational communication
- People skills
- Rapport
- Socionics

== Bibliography ==
- Altman, Irwin; Taylor, Dalmas A. (1973). Social Penetration: The Development of Interpersonal Relationships, New York: Holt, Rinehart, and Winston, p. 3, ISBN 978-0030766350
- Baack, Donald; Fogliasso, Christine; Harris, James (2000). "The Personal Impact of Ethical Decisions: A Social Penetration Theory". Journal of Business Ethics. 24 (1): 39–49. doi:10.1023/a:1006016113319. S2CID 142611191.
- Floyd, Kory. (2009). Interpersonal Communication: The Whole Story, New York: McGraw-Hill. (bibliographical information)
- Griffin, E. (2012). A First Look at Communication Theory (9th ed.), New York: McGraw-Hill. pp. 115–117, ISBN 978-0-07-353430-5
- Heider, F. (1958). The psychology of Interpersonal Relations. Hillsdale, NJ: Lawrence Erlbaum Associates.
- Mongeau, P., and M. Henningsen. "Stage theories of relationship development." Engaging theories in interpersonal communication: Multiple perspectives (2008): 363–375.
- Pearce, Barnett. Making Social Worlds: A Communication Perspective, Wiley-Blackwell, January, 2008, ISBN 1-4051-6260-0
- Stone, Douglas; Patton, Bruce and Heen, Sheila. Difficult Conversations: How to Discuss What Matters Most, Penguin, 1999, ISBN 0-14-028852-X
- Ury, William. Getting Past No: Negotiating Your Way from Confrontation to Cooperation, revised second edition, Bantam, January 1, 1993, trade paperback, ISBN 0-553-37131-2; 1st edition under the title, Getting Past No: Negotiating with Difficult People, Bantam, September, 1991, hardcover, 161 pages, ISBN 0-553-07274-9
- Ury, William; Fisher, Roger and Patton, Bruce. Getting to Yes: Negotiating Agreement Without Giving in, Revised 2nd edition, Penguin USA, 1991, trade paperback, ISBN 0-14-015735-2; Houghton Mifflin, April, 1992, hardcover, 200 pages, ISBN 0-395-63124-6. The first edition, unrevised, Houghton Mifflin, 1981, hardcover, ISBN 0-395-31757-6
- West, R., Turner, L.H. (2007). Introducing Communication Theory. New York: McGraw-Hill.
- Johnson, Chandra. "Face time vs. screen time: The technological impact on communication." national.deseretnews.com. Deseret Digital Media. 29 Aug. 2014. Web. 29 Mar. 2016.
- Robinson, Lawrence, Jeanne Segal, and Melinda Smith. "Effective Communication: Improving Communication Skills in Your Work and Personal Relationships." Help Guide. Mar. 2016. Web. 5 April 2016.
- Tardanico, Susan. "Is Social Media Sabotaging Real Communication?" Forbes: Leadership, 30 April 2012. Web. 10 Mar. 2016.
- White, Martha C. "The Real Reason New College Grads Can't Get Hired." time.com. EBSCOhost. 11 Nov. 2013. Web. 12 April 2016.
- Wimer, Jeremy. Manager of Admission Services, Bachelor of Arts in Organizational and Strategic Communication, Master of Science in Management of Organizational Leadership & Change, Colorado Technical University. Personal Email interview. 22 Mar. 2016.
