= Comprehensive model of information seeking =

Theory on how people seek information

The comprehensive model of information seeking, or CMIS, is a theoretical construct designed to predict how people will seek information. It was first developed by J. David Johnson and has been utilized by a variety of disciplines including library and information science and health communication.

The CMIS has been empirically tested in health and organizational contexts. It has inherent strengths for studying how people react to health problems such as cancer. It specifies "antecedents" that explain why people become information seekers, "information carrier characteristic" that shape how they go about looking for information, and "information seeking actions" that reflect the nature of the search itself.

== Design ==
The comprehensive model of information seeking

The CMIS has been quantitatively tested and performs well when it comes to health information seeking behaviors. There are three main schemas in the CMIS. These are: Antecedents, information field, and information seeking actions. The antecedents are those factors that determine how an information consumer will receive the information. Those factors are: Demographics, personal experience, salience, and beliefs. These factors are fluid and can change during the health information seeking process. The second schema is the information fields that consist of characteristics and utilities. This schema is concerned with the channels and carriers of information. A person's understanding is developed through the information field. The third schema involves the transformational processes and measured by the consumer's understanding of the messages received through the information field. The final schema involves information seeking actions. This is what the consumer does as a result of the first two schemas through information seeking. There are three major dimensions: the scope, depth, and method of information seeking.

== Antecedents ==
The CMIS antecedents—demographics, personal experience, salience, and beliefs—are factors that determine an individual's natural predisposition to search for information from particular information carriers. Certain types of health information seeking can be triggered by an individual's degree of personal experience with disease. In the CMIS framework, two personal relevance factors, salience and beliefs, are seen as the primary determinants in translating a perceived gap into an active search for information. Salience refers to the personal significance of health information to the individual, such as perceptions of risk to one's health, which are likely to result in information seeking action. However, people also may be motivated to gather information to determine the implications of health events for themselves and/or others related to their future activities, a factor directly related to the rapidly growing field of genetics. An individual's beliefs about the nature of a particular disease, its impacts, and level of control, all directly relate to self-efficacy, one of our key variables, and one that plays an important role in information seeking and people's more general pattern of actions related to health.

== Information carrier characteristics ==
The information carrier characteristics are drawn from a model of media exposure and appraisal that has been tested on a variety of information carriers, including both sources and channels, and in a variety of cultural settings. Following the media exposure and appraisal, the CMIS focuses on editorial tone, communication potential, and utility. In the CMIS, characteristics are composed of editorial tone, which reflects an audience member's perception of credibility, while communication potential relates to issues of style and comprehensiveness. Utility relates the characteristics of a medium directly to the needs of an individual, and shares much with the uses and gratifications perspectives.

== Information-seeking actions ==
There are several types of information seeking actions that can result from the impetus provided by the factors identified by the CMIS. For example, search behavior can be characterized by its extent, or the number of activities carried out, which has two components: scope, the number of alternatives investigated; and, depth, the number of dimensions of an alternative investigated. There is also the method of the search, or channel, as another major dimension of the search. For instance, an individual might choose the method of consulting a telephone information service, decide to have a narrow scope by only asking questions about smoking cessation clinics, but investigate every recommendation in detail, thus increasing the depth of the search.

== Stages in the CMIS ==
A key concept from the CMIS is the notion of "stages," or "cancer involvement." According to the CMIS, an individual may be at one of four stages regarding a cancer threat, and thereby have differing information needs and behaviors.

The casual stage is characterized by a general lack of concern or interest. At this stage, individuals are not purposive in their search for cancer-related information; rather, their search is accidental and aimless, even apathetic.

The purposive-placed stage is characterized by the question, "What can I do to prevent cancer?" Individuals here might have some passing interest in cancer or genetic information, but are generally still not affected or directly concerned.

The purposive-clustered stage is experienced by individuals in closer proximity to cancer. This is the point at which a person is motivated to look for practical information that will address the specific problem. For example, a first-degree relative of a recently diagnosed breast cancer patient may seek genetic screening or BRCA 1/2 testing. The person could clearly benefit from such information- seeking behavior since medical authorities acknowledge that early detection of cancer leads to earlier treatments and better treatment outcomes.

The directed stage includes individuals who have been diagnosed as having cancer. Such individuals need knowledge for making informed decisions about treatment and management of the disease.
