= Anxiety/uncertainty management =

Theory of effective communication

Anxiety/uncertainty management (AUM) theory explores how individuals manage anxiety and uncertainty when interacting with people from different cultural backgrounds. Developed by William B. Gudykunst, AUM theory posits that effective intercultural communication depends on reducing these feelings of anxiety and uncertainty. Building upon the foundation of uncertainty reduction theory (URT), which was introduced by Berger and Calabrese, AUM theory examines how individuals navigate the complexities of intercultural encounters, particularly with strangers. As a communication theory, AUM continues to evolve based on observations of human behavior in social situations.

== Differences with URT and the introduction of anxiety ==
While uncertainty reduction theory (URT) focuses on how people manage uncertainty in social situations, AUM expands upon this by incorporating the role of anxiety, particularly in intercultural contexts. URT suggests that uncertainty arises from our attempts to predict others' attitudes, values, feelings, beliefs, and behaviors during social encounters. We are motivated to reduce this uncertainty when we anticipate future interactions, when the other person possesses something we desire, or when the other person acting in a strange or deviant way which is unexpected. Berger's URT model includes seven axioms (evident truths) and 21 theorems (theoretical statements which are generally accepted, but are used to observe behaviours in need of more proof) that have spurred significant research, including the development of AUM.

AUM builds on URT's foundation but integrates anxiety management alongside uncertainty management, formulating a more extensive set of 47 axioms. A key distinction is that while URT primarily addresses individual or one-on-one communication, AUM focuses on intercultural and intergroup interactions. It incorporates Stephan and Stephan's work on anxiety, extending URT's scope to encompass these broader communication dynamics.

Furthermore, the goals of the two theories differ. URT aims simply to reduce uncertainty, whereas AUM aims for cultural adaptation, a more complex outcome. AUM recognizes that anxiety is not simply eliminated but rather managed within a tolerable range. This understanding, combined with the recognition of mindfulness as a factor in effective communication, led Gudykunst to name his research Anxiety/Uncertainty Management theory.

Gudykunst assumed that at least one participant in an intercultural encounter is a "stranger"—someone who feels insecure and unsure how to behave. While both strangers and in-group members experience some degree of anxiety and uncertainty in new interpersonal situations, intercultural encounters heighten these feelings. Strangers become hyper-aware of cultural differences and may overestimate the influence of culture on behavior while overlooking individual variations.

AUM was initially designed as a practical, highly applicable theory. Its structure involves numerous converging axioms that aim to explain effective communication. The specific number of these axioms has evolved over time as cross-cultural communication research has progressed.

== Scope ==
Communication theories commonly focus on four levels: individual, interpersonal, intergroup, and cultural.

• The individual level is the motivation for human communication, influencing the ways humans create and interpret messages (for example, the need for group inclusion and self-concept support).

• The interpersonal level is the way the message is exchanged when humans are communicating as an individual (for example, one-on-one communication, intimate relationships and social networks).

• The intergroup level is the exchange of messages when humans are communicating as a collective (for example, social identities, collective self-esteem).

• The cultural level is how people communicate similarly or differently dependent on their culture (for example, dimensions of cultural variability).

AUM focuses on interpersonal and intergroup levels of communication, with Gudykunst's axioms fitting into either the interpersonal or the intergroup categories. AUM discriminates between interpersonal and intergroup communications by examining predictions of behaviour. If the behaviour can be explained with cultural norms or with sociological norms, it can be classified as intergroup communication. When the behavior is best explained by psychological factors it is likely interpersonal communication. A second effective differentiator is to examine the identities that guide human behavior. When behavior is guided by personal or human factors, interpersonal behaviors tend to occur. When it is guided by social factors, the opposite is true.

== Working assumptions ==
Complex theories such as AUM need to accept certain assumptions as true before the real content can be explored. Some metatheoretical assumptions Gudykunst makes on AUM are on the nature of reality, the way we gain knowledge, and the basis of human behavior. Gudykunst assumes that the basic processes of communication are the same across cultures; only the methods of interpretation vary. Also, he assumes these interpretations are how we gain data to create theories. Finally, and vital to AUM, he assumes that when humans are mindful they have greater control over their communications behaviors. This aspect of human nature is sometimes referred to as determinism.

Gudykunst also employs several theoretical assumptions. The first is that strangers will trigger both interpersonal and intergroup anxiety. The perspective he takes for the sake of developing axioms is that of the stranger immersed in an ingroup.

Another assumption deals with the concept of uncertainty. Gudykunst assumes that when uncertainty falls between an individual's minimum and maximum acceptable levels, effective communication will then take place. The maximum threshold is defined as the amount of uncertainty that we can possess and still comfortably predict the behavior of a stranger. Uncertainty above the minimum threshold keeps us from getting bored with the stranger and hence constraining communication.

Anxiety for the purposes of anxiety/uncertainty management can be described as an apprehension based on the fear of negative consequences. It is more prevalent in intergroup relations because there is an added fear of appearing prejudiced when dealing with an outgroup. Similar to uncertainty, Gudykunst postulates that effective communication relies on managing anxiety between minimum and maximum thresholds. Once we reach our upper limit for anxiety, virtually all of our attention focuses on its source and not on effective communication. The concept of managing levels anxiety can be compared to managing eustress and distress to achieve optimum performance. The positive benefit of the optimum amount of anxiety is trust, or "confidence that one will find what is desired from another rather than what is feared" The negative consequence is avoidance. If we are overcome by anxiety we will simply choose not to communicate.

Another term needing a working definition for the purpose of anxiety/uncertainty management is "effective communication". Simply put, effective communication is the extent to which a message is interpreted by its recipient with the intended meaning from the sender. Communication is more effective when both the sender and receiver use the same frames of reference. However, in intercultural communication this is often untrue and interactions with strangers can in turn prove more difficult.

Finally, the mechanism around which anxiety/uncertainty management revolves is mindfulness. When people communicate mindlessly, they tend to utilize broad categories and stereotypes to predict behavior. As mindfulness increases, the categories become more specific and typically more accurate predictors. Since being mindful makes us open to more information we are more likely to correctly identify the receiver's frame of interpretation.

Mindfulness refers to a conscious choice rather than scripted behavior. Em Griffin, author of the communication book A First Look At Communication Theory and Professor Emeritus of Communications at Wheaton College in Illinois, defines mindfulness as "the way that in-group members and strangers can reduce their anxiety and uncertainty to optimum levels". Scripted behavior serves us well in familiar situations, but not in cross-cultural communication. William Howell suggests four levels of communication competence.

- Unconscious incompetence: We are unaware that we are misinterpreting others' behavior.
- Conscious incompetence: We know that we are misinterpreting others' behavior but do not do anything about it.
- Conscious competence: We think about our communication and continually work to become more effective.
- Unconscious competence: Our communication skills are automatic.

Gudykunst defined mindfulness as stage three (conscious competence) in Howell's model. In this stage, cognitive choice moderates the destructive force of doubt or fear. The last stage (unconscious competence), is less competent than stage three and can quickly shift into oblivious incompetence. Mindfulness involves the creation of new categories, a new process of thinking, and formation of a kin which reinforces Delia's description of how a cognitively complex person uses a lot of interpersonal constructs.

== Theory constructions ==
Schematic describing anxiety/uncertainty management theory

Gudykunst uses two types of theoretical statements to construct his theory; axioms and theorems. Axioms are "propositions that involve variables that are taken to be directly linked causally; axioms should therefore be statements that imply direct causal links among variables" Some axioms do not apply in all situations. Boundary conditions specify when the axioms hold. The axioms can be combined to derive theorems. When combined the axioms and theorems form a "casual process" theory that explains effective communication. Dialectical processes influence much of our communication within specific interactions. To illustrate, uncertainty involves a dialectic between predictability and novelty. In the current version of the theory, dialectics are incorporated as boundary conditions for the axioms where applicable.

Gudykunst states that in generating the axioms for the theory he assumed that managing anxiety and uncertainty are "basic causes" influencing effective communication. Other variables (e.g. self-concepts, motivation, reactions to strangers, social categorization, situational processes, connections with strangers, ethical interactions, anxiety, uncertainty, mindfulness and effective communication), are treated as "superficial causes" of effective communication. The influence of these "superficial causes" on effective communication is mediated through anxiety and uncertainty. Being mindful allows us to engage in anxiety and uncertainty management.

Gudykunst uses 47 axioms as building blocks for the theorems of AUM. Axioms can be thought of as the lowest common denominators from which all causal theorems are derived.

== Self-concepts ==
Axioms one through five all relate to views of oneself, or self-concepts. Gudykunst includes personal identities, social identities, and collective self-esteem in this category. Social identities are employed when one tries to predict intergroup behavior and personal identities are naturally employed for interpersonal behavior. They both act in such a way as to help people manage uncertainty and anxiety by sufficiently predicting behavior. If either of these identities feels threatened, Gudykunst believes that people will attempt to raise collective self-esteem, hence fostering a more positive outcome. The greater one's self-esteem, the better one is able to manage our anxiety.

Axiom	Description	Boundary conditions
1	An increase in the degree to which our social identities guide our interactions with strangers will produce a decrease in our anxiety and an increase in our confidence in predicting their behavior.	This axiom holds only when we are secure in our social identities, we are not mindful, if strangers are perceived to by typical outgroup members, and when our anxiety and uncertainty are between our minimum and maximum thresholds
2	An increase in the degree to which our personal identities guide our interactions with strangers will produce a decrease in our anxiety and an increase in our ability to predict their behavior accurately.	This axiom holds only in individualistic cultures, when we are not mindful, we are secure in our personal identities, and our anxiety and uncertainty are between our minimum and maximum thresholds.
3	An increase in our self-esteem when interacting with strangers will produce a decrease in our anxiety and an increase in our ability to predict their behavior accurately.	This axiom holds only when our anxiety and uncertainty are between our minimum and maximum thresholds, and we are not mindful.
4	An increase in our ingroup-specific collective self-esteem when interacting with strangers from outgroups based on the specific ingroup will produce a decrease in our anxiety and an increase in our ability to predict their behavior accurately.	This axiom holds only for the ingroups on which the collective self-esteem is based, when our anxiety and uncertainty are between our minimum and maximum thresholds, and when we are not mindful.
5	An increase in perceived threats to our social identities when interacting with strangers will produce an increase in our anxiety and a decrease in our confidence in predicting their behavior.	This axiom holds only when we are not mindful.

== Motivation ==
Gudykunst's next set of axioms suggest that motivation to interact with strangers is directly related to the fulfillment of needs. First, there is a need to trust others to behave favorably, or at least in an expected manner. Second, and only in the context of intergroup relations, one needs to feel inclusion with the group or anxiety will surely develop. Paradoxically, the third need that Gudykunst points out is the need for self-concept confirmation. People want to be included in the group, but not to the extent that their identity is lost in the crowd.

Axiom	Description	Boundary conditions
6	An increase in our need for group inclusion when interacting with strangers will produce an increase in our anxiety.	This axiom holds only when we are not mindful.
7	An increase in our need to sustain our self-conceptions when interacting with strangers will produce an increase in our anxiety.	This axiom holds only when we are not mindful.
8	An increase in the degree to which strangers confirm our self-conceptions will produce a decrease in our anxiety.	This axiom holds only when our anxiety and uncertainty are between our minimum and maximum thresholds, and when we are not mindful.
9	An increase in our confidence in our ability to predict strangers' behavior will produce a decrease in our anxiety; a decrease in our anxiety will produce an increase in our confidence in predicting strangers' behavior.	This axiom holds only when our anxiety and uncertainty are between our minimum and maximum thresholds, and when we are not mindful.

== Reactions to strangers ==
People tend to act more favorably toward strangers whose mannerisms and beliefs converge with their own. In this case, people have a greater propensity to exhibit empathy, tolerate more ambiguity, and have a less rigid social posture when seeking closure. A rigid attitude, or close-minded thinking, leads people to seek closure to an interaction in the most direct way possible. If people were to exhibit empathy and attempt to think more objectively about the perspective of the stranger, they should in turn be postured to accept more ambiguity and seek the most appropriate solution instead of the most direct.

Axiom	Description	Boundary conditions
10	An increase in our ability to process information complexly about strangers will produce a decrease in our anxiety and an increase in our ability to predict their behavior accurately.	This axiom holds only when our anxiety and uncertainty are between our minimum and maximum thresholds, and we are not mindful.
11	An increase in the rigidity of our attitudes toward strangers will produce an increase in our anxiety and a decrease in our ability to predict their behavior accurately.	This axiom holds only when our anxiety and uncertainty are between our minimum and maximum thresholds, and we are not mindful.
12	An increase in our uncertainty orientation will produce an increase in our ability to predict strangers' behavior accurately.	This axiom holds only when our uncertainty is between our minimum and maximum thresholds, and we are not mindful.
13	An increase in our tolerance for ambiguity will produce a decrease in our anxiety.	This axiom holds only when our anxiety and uncertainty are between our minimum and maximum thresholds, and we are not mindful.
14	An increase in our ability to empathize with strangers will produce a decrease in our anxiety and an increase in our ability to predict their behavior accurately.	This axiom holds only when we respect strangers and when our anxiety and uncertainty are between our minimum and maximum thresholds, and we are not mindful.
15	An increase in the degree to which strangers converge toward us will produce a decrease in our anxiety and an increase in our confidence in predicting their behavior.	This axiom holds only in individualistic cultures when we are secure in our social identities and we do not perceive threats from strangers, when our anxiety and uncertainty are between our minimum and maximum thresholds, and we are not mindful.

== Social categorization of strangers ==
The next seven axioms of this theory focus on how people order their social environments into categories. When people categorize themselves, they become aware of being members of ingroups and outgroups, which generates anxiety and uncertainty. People tend to have more categories for their ingroup than they do for an outgroup, but the more familiar they are with an outgroup, the more categories they see. The categories that people create for outgroups will lead to expectations about the behavior of a member of that group, which can be either positive or negative. Expectations then help people predict, accurately or inaccurately, a stranger's behavior.

Axiom	Description	Boundary conditions
16	An increase in our understanding of similarities and differences between our groups and strangers' groups will produce a decrease in our anxiety and an increase in our ability to accurately predict their behavior.	This axiom holds only when our anxiety and uncertainty are between our minimum and maximum thresholds, we are not mindful, and only for strangers who strongly identify with their groups.
17	An increase in the personal similarities we perceive between ourselves and strangers will produce a decrease in our anxiety and an increase in our ability to predict their behavior accurately.	This axiom holds only when our anxiety and uncertainty are between our minimum and maximum thresholds, and we are not mindful.
18	An increase in our ability to categorize strangers in the same categories they categorize themselves will produce an increase in our ability to predict their behavior accurately.	This axiom holds only when our anxiety and uncertainty are between our minimum and maximum thresholds, and we are not mindful.
19	An increase in the variability we perceive in strangers' groups will produce a decrease in our anxiety and an increase in our ability to predict their behavior accurately.	This axiom holds only when our anxiety and uncertainty are between our minimum and maximum thresholds, and we are not mindful.
20	An increase in perceiving that we share superordinate ingroup identities with strangers will produce a decrease in our anxiety and an increase in our ability to predict their behavior accurately	his axiom holds only when our anxiety and uncertainty are between our minimum and maximum thresholds, and we are not mindful.
21	An increase in our positive expectations for strangers' behavior will produce a decrease in our anxiety and an increase in our confidence in predicting their behavior	This axiom holds only when our anxiety and uncertainty are between our minimum and a maximum thresholds, and we are not mindful.
22	An increase in our ability to suspend our negative expectations for strangers' behavior when they are activated will produce a decrease in our anxiety and an increase in our ability to predict their behavior accurately.	This axiom holds only when we are mindful of the process of communication, and our anxiety and uncertainty are between our minimum and maximum thresholds

== Situational processes ==
The next four axioms are based on the situations in which communication occurs. People have different scripts they expect to follow for a given situation, much like actors may follow a movie script. Miscommunication occurs when people follow a script they assume the stranger with whom they are communicating to be familiar. People also react to strangers differently based on the conditions in which they interact. For example, cooperation was found to lead to positive feelings towards those one is working with. People also tend to have less anxiety when there are other members of their ingroups present. Power also affects communication, and a person who feels they have less power than the stranger in an interaction will feel more anxiety towards that interaction.

Axiom	Description	Boundary conditions
23	An increase in the cooperative structure of the tasks on which we work with strangers will produce a decrease in our anxiety and an increase in our confidence in predicting their behavior.	This axiom holds only when our anxiety and uncertainty are between our minimum and maximum thresholds, and we are not mindful.
24	An increase in the normative and institutional support for communicating with strangers will produce a decrease in our anxiety and an increase in our confidence in predicting their behavior.	This axiom holds only when our anxiety and uncertainty are between our minimum and maximum thresholds, and we are not mindful.
25	An increase in the percentage of our ingroup members present in a situation will produce a decrease in our anxiety.	This axiom holds only when our anxiety and uncertainty are between our minimum and maximum thresholds, and we are not mindful.
26	An increase in the power we perceive that we have over strangers will produce a decrease in our anxiety and an increase in the accuracy of our predictions of their behavior.	This axiom holds only when our anxiety and uncertainty are between our minimum and maximum thresholds, and we are not mindful.

== Connections with strangers ==
The next five axioms are based on connections between people. What the axioms come to is the more connected people feel to strangers, the less anxiety and uncertainty they feel in communicating with them. These connections come from attraction, interdependence, levels of intimacy, and number of the same people both communicators know.

Axiom	Description	Boundary conditions
27	An increase in our attraction to strangers will produce a decrease in our anxiety and an increase in our confidence in predicting their behavior	This axiom holds only when our anxiety and uncertainty are between our minimum and maximum thresholds, and we are not mindful.
28	An increase in the quantity and quality of our contact with strangers and members of their groups will produce a decrease in our anxiety and an increase in our ability to predict their behavior accurately.	This axiom holds only when our anxiety and uncertainty are between our minimum and maximum thresholds, and we are not mindful.
29	An increase in our interdependence with strangers will produce a decrease in our anxiety and an increase in our ability to predict their behavior accurately.	This axiom holds only when our anxiety and uncertainty are between our minimum and maximum thresholds, and we are not mindful.
30	An increase in the intimacy of our relationships will produce a decrease in our anxiety and an increase in our ability to predict their behavior accurately.	This axiom applies only to broad trends across stages of relationship development. Within any stage of relationship development or within specific conversations, anxiety and uncertainty fluctuate (i.e. act as dialectics). The axiom holds only when we are not mindful.
31	An increase in the networks we share with strangers will produce a decrease in our anxiety and an increase in our ability to accurately predict their behavior.	This axiom holds only when our anxiety and uncertainty are between our minimum and maximum thresholds, and we are not mindful.

== Ethical interactions ==
The next three axioms are based on dignity and respect. Both dignity and respect are assumed to be returned when given to a stranger. This leads to moral inclusiveness, which is good for interactions with strangers because both sides expect the rules of fair play to apply to them. When strangers are considered morally excluded, they are treated almost as nonexistent, or as not deserving of respect or dignity. Moral inclusiveness applies not only to communication, but also to bystanders not actively involved in communication with strangers. For example, if a person makes an anti-prejudice statement, the people he or she is with are less likely to make a prejudiced statement towards a stranger.

Axiom	Description	Boundary conditions
32	An increase in our ability to maintain our own and strangers' dignity in our interactions with them will produce a decrease in our anxiety.	This axiom holds only when our anxiety is between our minimum and maximum thresholds, and we are not mindful.
33	An increase in our respect for strangers will produce a decrease in our anxiety	This axiom holds only when our anxiety is between our minimum and maximum thresholds, and we are not mindful.
34	An increase in our moral inclusiveness toward strangers will produce a decrease in our anxiety.	This axiom holds only when our anxiety is between our minimum and maximum thresholds, and we are not mindful.

== Anxiety, uncertainty, mindfulness, and effective communication ==
Langer states that mindfulness involves creating new categories, an openness to new information, and being aware of strangers' perspectives. Mindfulness is essential for effective communication and one needs to develop mindful ways of learning about strangers. Langer concludes that this should involve: openness to "novelty", awareness of distinctions, being sensitive to different contexts, an awareness of multiple perspectives, and an orientation to the present. For example, strangers are usually more mindful and able to "negotiate potentially problematic social interactions more effectively" than ingroup members. Therefore, ingroup members should be mindful of the process of communicating as opposed to being mindful of the outcome of the interaction.

The following five axioms are essential for effective communication because they focus on the basic causes and processes of effective communication whereas the previous 34 axioms focused on managing our anxiety and uncertainty when communicating with strangers.

Axiom	Description	Boundary conditions
35	An increase in our ability to describe strangers' behavior will produce an increase in our ability to predict their behavior accurately.	This axiom holds only when we are mindful of the process of communication, we are not overly vigilant, and our anxiety and uncertainty are between our minimum and maximum thresholds.
36	An increase in our knowledge of strangers languages and/or dialects will produce a decrease in our anxiety and an increase in our ability to predict their behavior accurately.	This axiom holds only when our anxiety and uncertainty are between our minimum and maximum thresholds, and when we are not mindful.
37	An increase in our mindfulness of the process of our communication with the strangers will produce an increase in our ability to manage our anxiety and an increase in our ability to manage our uncertainty.	This axiom holds only when we are not overly vigilant.
38	An increase in mindfully recognizing and correcting pragmatic errors that occur in our conversations with strangers facilitates negotiating with strangers which will produce an increase in the effectiveness of our communication.	This axiom holds only when we are mindful of the process of communication and we are not overly vigilant, and our anxiety and uncertainty are between our minimum and maximum thresholds.
39	An increase in our ability to manage our anxiety about interacting with strangers and an increase in the accuracy of our predictions and explanations regarding their behavior will produce an increase in the effectiveness of our communication.	This axiom holds only when we are mindful of the process of communication and we are not overly vigilant, and our anxiety and uncertainty are between our minimum and maximum thresholds.

== Cross-cultural variability in AUM processes ==
Gudykunst believes that for the theory to be complete there must be a cultural level of analysis included and that the axioms regarding cultural variability should only be tested on the cultural level. It is necessary to address cross-cultural variability in the major components of the theory because different types of anxiety are emphasized more in some cultures than in others. This is because there are differences in the dynamics of stranger–ingroup relationships across cultures. For example, Triandis offers that collectivist cultures tend to make a stronger distinction between ingroup and outgroup members, whereas members of individualistic cultures usually only draw as sharp of distinctions among differing ethnic groups.

Axiom	Description	Boundary conditions
40	An increase in cultural collectivism will produce an increase in the sharpness with which the stranger-ingroup distinction is drawn.	This axiom does not apply to stranger-ingroup relationships based on ethnicity, and when we are mindful.
41	An increase in cultural uncertainty avoidance will produce an increase in ingroup members' xenophobia about interacting with strangers.	This axiom does not hold when we are mindful.
42	An increase in cultural masculinity will produce an increase in the sharpness of the stranger-ingroup distinction drawn for opposite-sex relationships	This axiom does not hold when we are mindful.
43	An increase in cultural power distance will produce an increase in the sharpness of the stranger-ingroup distinction drawn for relationships involving unequal statuses.	This axiom does not hold when we are mindful.
44	An increase in cultural uncertainty avoidance will produce an increase in the sharpness of the stranger-ingroup distinction drawn based on age.	This axiom does not hold for intergenerational communication within families or when we are mindful.
45	An increase in cultural individualism will produce an increase in ingroup members' use of person-based information to manage uncertainty with strangers; an increase in cultural collectivism will produce an increase in ingroup members' use of group-based and situation-based information to manage uncertainty with strangers.	This axiom does not hold when we are mindful.
46	When there are clear rules for stranger-ingroup interactions, an increase in cultural uncertainty avoidance will produce a decrease in the anxiety and uncertainty experienced communicating with strangers. When there are not clear rules for stranger-ingroup interactions, an increase in cultural uncertainty avoidance will produce an increase in the anxiety and uncertainty experienced interacting with strangers.	This axiom does not hold when we are mindful.
47	An increase in cultural individualism will produce an increase in the focus on cognitive understanding to communicate effectively with strangers. An increase in cultural collectivism will produce an increase in the focus on maintaining good relations between communicators to communicate effectively.	This axiom does not hold when we are mindful

== Critique ==
There are many ways AUM theory can be applied. It can be effective in studying the behavior of a stranger adjusting to a new culture, as well as in examining how individuals communicate with strangers and often accurately predict their behavior; this is done when we are mindful. Gudykunst explains that some axioms can be combined to form theorems. These theorems that are generated might be consistent with previous research, while others might be useful for future study. He notes that not all axioms can be combined to form a new theorem. Huber and Sorrentino differentiate between certainty–oriented individuals and uncertainty-oriented individuals and argue that theories of interpersonal and intergroup relations have an "uncertainty orientation" bias. Gudykunst gives three reasons why AUM theory is not limited to uncertainty-oriented individuals. First, uncertainty-orientation is incorporated into the theory. Second, the superficial causes or factors that influence our uncertainty in a situation influence the amount of uncertainty we feel. Lastly, our personality characteristics influence our behavior only when we are not mindful. Gudykunst also defends the number of axioms in the theory because when the goal of a theory is to improve communication, one cannot afford to be vague. Gudykunst acknowledges that there are certain areas where additional research is needed. For instance, one cannot always be mindful when communicating. Potential problems then refer to the recognition of instances in which mindfulness is needed and defining the optimal levels of anxiety or uncertainty. Future research needs to develop ways to measure an individual's minimum and maximum thresholds of uncertainty and anxiety in the same way that anxiety and uncertainty are measured. AUM theory is in a constant state of revision and even the current version of the theory is not complete.

=== Critiques by Griffin and Ting-Toomey ===
Griffin identifies the complexity of the AUM theory as a weakness arguing, "hypothetically, the 47 axioms could spawn over a thousand theorems."

Potential expansion of the axioms as a result of incorporation of more cultural variability indicates the possibility of causing greater confusion and complication.

Ting-Toomey explores the content of AUM theory as a potential weakness demanding further revision of the theories. She points out five conceptual issues in relation to URT and the social penetration theory.

Conceptual issues of URT and Social Penetration Theory:

  1. the need for motivational factors and other variables of the host side that influence the uncertainty reduction process;
  2. the lack of attention to relational changes;
  3. the necessity of actual research on dyadic effect of reciprocity;
  4. the inevitability of integration of more contextual dimensions into the theories and research;

=== Limited focus: effective communication ===
Visual representation of Yoshitake's critique of AUM theory.

The AUM theory regards effective communication as a primary construct, defining effective communication as the attribution of the closest meaning to incoming messages as intended by the sender which would minimise misunderstanding. This view leads to two potential problems as the definition of effective communication and effective communication as the goal of ICC.

=== Problem of the definition of effective communication ===
There are various reasons for human communication which lead to questioning the possibility and the necessity of attributing the closest meaning to such great variety of communication situations. The AUM theory regards effective communication as attribution of the closest meaning to the intended meaning diminishes communication mechanical and linear activity "where messages are transferred from sender to receiver".

=== Problem of effective communication as a goal of ICC ===
AUM theory defines the goal of effective communication as the decrease of miscommunication. Such perspective on communication is mechanical with little emotional attachment, regarding pure communication without misattribution as ideal. As great importance is given to efficiency, culture is referred to as "noise" that obstructs the smooth transition of communication.

=== Excessive reliance on consciousness ===
Anxiety/uncertainty management theory has been criticised for its heavy focus on the person being mindful during communications, with there being an assumption that a person should have to adopt a high level of consciousness throughout communication. However, the theory is difficult to apply to instances where a person is compelled by emotion or irrationality, which overrides conscious thought to reach an end goal during communication.

=== Meta-theoretical critique ===
The meta-theoretical assumptions specific to Anxiety/Uncertainty Management theory have been critiqued by Masaki Yoshitake of the University of Oklahoma, who suggests that anxiety/uncertainty management theory is inherently inefficient when attempting to describe a universal experience shared between strangers and members of different cultures. Yoshitake states that it is questionable whether interpersonal communication is really a pure form of communication and suggests a difficulty to determine what is in the mind of a person from another culture altogether. Yoshitake asserts that pure communication never exists in the first place, as every attempt to share a direct experience is mitigated by the limitations of a person's own perceptions. This results in an ever-present "otherness" in communication. Such commentary is a product of Cartesian thought.
