= Stephen W. Littlejohn =

American communication scholar (1944–2024)

Stephen Ward Littlejohn (September 12, 1944 – July 4, 2024) was an American communication scholar and consultant. He was best known for his foundational textbook Theories of Human Communication, widely regarded as the definitive overview of communication theory in the field.

== Education and career ==
Littlejohn was born in Los Angeles, California and grew up in La Habra, California, where he graduated from La Habra High School in 1962. He went on to earn a Bachelor of Arts in speech from the University of Redlands in 1966, followed by a Master of Arts in speech from the University of Utah in 1968, and a Doctor of Philosophy in Speech Communication, also from the University of Utah, in 1970. His thesis, An experimental study of source credibility and communication exposure, was advised by Don. F. Faules.

Littlejohn spent the core of his academic career at Humboldt State University in Arcata, California. He served as a professor in the Department of Speech Communication from 1970 to 1996. During his tenure, Littlejohn held several administrative roles. He was chair of the Department of Speech Communication between 1977 and 1980 and between 1988 and 1991, chair of the Department of Philosophy between 1989 and 1990. He was director of the Division of Interdisciplinary Studies and Special Programs from 1980 to 1984. During the 1984–1985 academic year, Littlejohn also served as a visiting professor in the Department of Communication Studies at the University of Massachusetts Amherst. In 1994, Littlejohn relocated to Albuquerque, New Mexico and joined the Department of Communication & Journalism at the University of New Mexico, where he taught until 2015.

From 1993 to 2010, Littlejohn also worked as a communication consultant. Together with Kathy Isaacson, he co-founded DLI Communication Consultants, a firm specializing in conflict management, strategic planning, public dialogue, mediation, and leadership development.

== Books ==
- Littlejohn, Stephen W.; Jabusch, David M. (1987). Persuasive transactions. Glenview, Ill: Scott, Foresman. ISBN 978-0-673-15987-8.
- Jabusch, David M.; Littlejohn, Stephen W. (1996). Elements of Speech Communication (3rd ed.). Bloomsbury Publishing PLC. ISBN 978-0-939693-37-5.
- Pearce, W. Barnett; Littlejohn, Stephen W. (1997). Moral conflict: when social worlds collide. Thousand Oaks, Calif: Sage Publications. ISBN 978-0-7619-0052-8.
- Littlejohn, Stephen W.; Domenici, Kathy (2000). Engaging communication in conflict: systemic practice. Thousand Oaks: Sage Publications. ISBN 978-0-7619-2186-8.
- Littlejohn, Stephen W. (2002). Learning and using communication theories: a student guide for theories of human communication (7th ed.). Toronto, Ontario: Wadsworth/Thomson Learning. ISBN 978-0-534-54958-9.
- Domenici, Kathy; Littlejohn, Stephen W. (2006). Facework: bridging theory and practice. Thousand Oaks, California: Sage Publications. ISBN 978-1-4522-2257-8.
- Littlejohn, Stephen W.; Domenici, Kathy (2007). Communication, conflict, and the management of difference. Long Grove, Ill: Waveland Press, Inc. ISBN 978-1-57766-503-8.
- Littlejohn, Stephen; Foss, Karen (2009). Encyclopedia of Communication Theory. Thousand Oaks, California: SAGE Publications. doi:10.4135/9781412959384. ISBN 978-1-4129-5937-7.
- Isaacson, Kathy; Ricci, Heidi; Littlejohn, Stephen W. (2020). Mediation: Empowerment in Conflict Management (3rd ed.). Waveland Press. ISBN 978-1-4786-4031-8.
- Littlejohn, Stephen W.; Foss, Karen A.; Oetzel, John G. (2025). Theories of Human Communication (13th ed.). Waveland Press. ISBN 978-1-4786-5747-7.
