= Karen A. Foss =

American academic (born 1950)

Karen Ann Foss (born January 26, 1950) is a rhetorical scholar and communication researcher, and educator. Her research and teaching interests include contemporary rhetorical theory and criticism, feminist perspectives on communication, the incorporation of marginalized voices into rhetorical theory and practice, and the reconceptualization of communication theories and constructs.

== History and background ==
Foss and her twin sister, Sonja K. Foss, who is also a rhetorical scholar and educator in communication, were born in Portland, Oregon, and grew up in Eugene, Oregon. Foss earned a B.A. in Romance Languages (Spanish and French) from the University of Oregon in 1972, an M.A. in Speech (Rhetoric and Public Address) from the University of Oregon in 1973, and a Ph.D. in Speech and Dramatic Art (Rhetoric and Public Address) from the University of Iowa in 1976. She taught at Humboldt State University (1976-1993) and the University of New Mexico (1993-2015), where she is now Regents professor emeritus. She served as director of Women Studies from 1978-1980 and 1989-1992 at Humboldt State University and from 1995-1997 at the University of New Mexico. She also served as department chair of Communication & Journalism at the University of New Mexico between 1997 and 2000 and between 2013 and 2015. She served as a visiting associate professor at the University of Massachusetts Amherst from 1984-1985 and as a Senior Specialist Fulbright Scholar to the University of Southern Denmark, Odense, Denmark, in March 2007.

== Scholarly work ==
Foss is the coauthor or coeditor of nine books, and she has published over seventy book chapters and essays in communication journals. Foss regularly presents her research at regional, national, and international conferences and has presented lectures in Denmark, Japan, Turkey, Argentina, and China and across the United States. She served for seven years (1981-1988) as the coeditor (with Sonja K. Foss) of the journal Women's Studies in Communication.

Some of Foss's work provides overviews of rhetorical and communication theories. Contemporary Perspectives on Rhetoric (with Sonja K. Foss and Robert Trapp) summarizes the theories of 10 rhetorical theorists, including Kenneth Burke, bell hooks, Jean Baudrillard, and Michel Foucault. Theories of Human Communication, now in its 11th edition, summarizes theories across the communication discipline. Foss and Stephen W. Littlejohn also coauthored, in 2009, the Encyclopedia of Communication Theory, a two-volume set covering theorists, concepts, and applications of communication theories.

In addition to compiling summaries of theories in communication, a primary focus of Foss's research program is a reconceptualization of communication concepts and theories from feminist perspectives. She is interested in how different assumptions, values, and marginalized speaking practices affect theories of communication. The impetus for much of this work was the feminist movements of the 1960s and 1970s that created awareness of the absence of women in the academy. Foss sought to introduce the study of women and gender into the communication discipline, illustrated by her essays on Deborah Sampson, the status of research on women and communication (with Sonja K. Foss), and personal experience as evidence in feminist scholarship (with Sonja K. Foss). She also helped bring the study of women's social movements into the discipline, exemplified by her essays about the Sapir-Whorf hypothesis in the contemporary women's movement (with Michael J. Schneider) and the Mothers of the Plaza de Mayo (with Kathy L. Domenici).

Another focus of Foss's feminist research program is the introduction of topics for study traditionally outside the purview of the communication discipline. Some of these deal with women's interests and concerns, traditionally excluded because of the singular focus of the discipline on men and their discourse. Women Speak: The Eloquence of Women's Lives (with Sonja K. Foss) offers one example of this work, showing how women's communication takes many forms outside of traditional speechmaking, from mothering to shopping to architecture to sewing. Other essays by Foss deal with topics such as women bullying women, sexual harassment, birth control, surrogacy, placenta practices, and marital names. She also advanced the inclusion of GLBTQ issues into the discipline, focusing in particular on the discourse of gay San Francisco supervisor Harvey Milk.

The focus of Foss's most recent work has been how feminist perspectives can transform the communication discipline. She seeks to reconstruct and transform theories to provide a more expansive tool kit for communicators—one that does not rely solely on the speaking practices of elite white men. Her position is summarized in "Transforming Rhetoric Through Feminist Reconstruction: A Response to the Gender Diversity Perspective (with Sonja K. Foss and Cindy L. Griffin). She also offered the communication discipline, in Feminist Rhetorical Theories (with Sonja K. Foss and Cindy L. Griffin), examples of alternative theories that emerged from the ideas and activism of such feminist thinkers as Sally Miller Gearhart, Gloria Anzaldúa, bell hooks, and Sonia Johnson. Inviting Transformation: Presentational Speaking for a Changing World (with Sonja K. Foss) is another example of Foss's efforts at reconceptualizing; here, Foss and Foss offer a new model of public speaking that incorporates principles of invitational rhetoric and the speaking practices of marginalized groups. In Gender Stories (with Sonja K. Foss and Mary E. Domenico), Foss reconceptualizes sex, gender, and feminism as social constructions. Foss also juxtaposes the paradigm of persuasion—the dominant view of change in the discipline—with an alternative approach drawn from a variety of other disciplines and traditions.

Foss also has been interested in ways to advance pedagogy and practice in the communication discipline. She has developed strategies for to help students with communication anxiety and provided graduate students with strategies for navigating graduate education. Other efforts have centered on ways to incorporate feminist perspectives into classes. In addition, Foss has sought to devise new formats for the classroom, such as individualized instruction, that creatively address the needs of contemporary university students and make classroom instruction more relevant and engaging. Her essay on the use of documentary film to teach rhetorical theory is an example of this pedagogical focus.

== Awards ==
Foss has been the recipient of numerous awards, including:

- Paul Boase Prize for Scholarship, Communication Studies, Ohio University, 2015.
- Robert J. Kibler Memorial Service Award, National Communication Association, November 2011.
- Feminist Scholar Award, Organization for Research on Women and Communication (with Sonja K. Foss), 2010. The award recognized the article, “Our Journey to Repowered Feminism: Expanding the Feminist Toolbox,” published in Women’s Studies in Communication.
- Regents Professor, College of Arts and Sciences, University of New Mexico, 2006-2009.
- Gender Scholar of the Year, Southern Communication Association (with Sonja K. Foss), 2005.
- Presidential Teaching Fellow, University of New Mexico, 2002-2004.
- Francine Merritt Award for contributions to women in communication, Women’s Caucus, National Communication Association, 2002.
- Outstanding Book Award, Organization for the Study of Communication, Language, and Gender (with Sonja K. Foss and Cindy L. Griffin), 2000. The award recognized the book Feminist Rhetorical Theories.
- Scholar of the Year, Humboldt State University, 1991-1992.

== Selected publications ==
- Littlejohn, Stephen W., Karen A. Foss, and John G. Oetzel. Theories of Human Communication, 11th ed. Long Grove, IL: Waveland, 2017.
- Foss, Sonja K., Mary E. Domenico, and Karen A. Foss. Gender Stories: Negotiating Identity in a Binary World. Long Grove, IL: Waveland, 2013.
- Littlejohn, Stephen W., and Karen A. Foss, eds. Encyclopedia of Communication Theory. 2 vols. Thousand Oaks, CA: Sage, 2009.
- Karen A. Foss, Sonja K. Foss, and Cindy L. Griffin, eds. Readings in Feminist Rhetorical Theory. Thousand Oaks, CA: Sage, 2004; reissued Long Grove, IL: Waveland, 2006.
- Foss, Sonja K., Karen A. Foss, and Robert Trapp. Contemporary Perspectives on Rhetoric. Long Grove, IL: Waveland, 1985; 2nd ed., 1991; 3rd ed., 2002; 4th ed./30th anniversary ed., 2014.
- Foss, Karen A., Sonja K. Foss, and Robert Trapp, eds. Readings in Contemporary Rhetoric. Long Grove, IL: Waveland, 2002.
- Karen A. Foss, Sonja K. Foss, and Cindy L. Griffin. Feminist Rhetorical Theories. Thousand Oaks, CA: Sage, 1999; reissued Long Grove, IL: Waveland, 2006.
- Foss, Sonja K., and Karen A. Foss. Inviting Transformation: Presentational Speaking for a Changing World. Long Grove, IL: Waveland, 1994; 2nd ed., 2003; 3rd ed., 2011.
- Foss, Karen A., and Sonja K. Foss. Women Speak: The Eloquence of Women's Lives. Long Grove, IL: Waveland, 1991.
- Foss, Karen A., and Ann Skinner-Jones. COLOR Up to Create the Life You Want to Live. Victoria BC, Canada: FriesenPress 2018.
