= Communication studies =

Academic discipline

Communication studies (or communication science) is an academic discipline that deals with processes of human communication and behavior, patterns of communication in interpersonal relationships, social interactions and communication in different cultures. Communication is commonly defined as giving, receiving or exchanging ideas, information, signals or messages through appropriate media, enabling individuals or groups to persuade, to seek information, to give information or to express emotions effectively. Communication studies is a social science that uses various methods of empirical investigation and critical analysis to develop a body of knowledge that encompasses a range of topics, from face-to-face conversation at a level of individual agency and interaction to social and cultural communication systems at a macro level.

Scholarly communication theorists focus primarily on refining the theoretical understanding of communication, examining statistics to help substantiate claims. The range of social scientific methods to study communication has been expanding. Communication researchers draw upon a variety of qualitative and quantitative techniques. The linguistic and cultural turns of the mid-20th century led to increasingly interpretative, hermeneutic, and philosophic approaches towards the analysis of communication. Conversely, the end of the 1990s and the beginning of the 2000s have seen the rise of new analytically, mathematically, and computationally focused techniques.

As a field of study, communication is applied to journalism, business, mass media, public relations, marketing, news and television broadcasting, interpersonal and intercultural communication, education, public administration, the problem of media-adequacy—and beyond. As all spheres of human activity and conveyance are affected by the interplay between social communication structure and individual agency, communication studies has gradually expanded its focus to other domains, such as health, medicine, economy, military and penal institutions, the Internet, social capital, and the role of communicative activity in the development of scientific knowledge.

== History ==
=== Origins ===
Communication, a natural human behavior, became a topic of study in the 20th century. As communication technologies developed, so did the serious study of communication. During this time, a renewed interest in the study of rhetoric, including persuasion and public address, emerged, ultimately laying the foundation for several forms of communication studies we know today. The focus of communication studies developed further in the 20th century, eventually including means of communication such as mass communication, interpersonal communication, and oral interpretation. When World War I ended, the interest in studying communication intensified. The methods of communication used during the war challenged many people's beliefs about the limits of war that existed before these events. New inventions emerged during this period, such as aircraft, telephones, and throat microphones. New ways of communicating, especially the use of Morse code through portable machines, helped troops to communicate in a more rapid pace than before. This then sparked ideas for even more advanced ways of communication to be later created and discovered.

The social sciences were fully recognized as legitimate disciplines after World War II. Before being established as its own discipline, communication studies was formed from three other major studies: psychology, sociology, and political science. Communication studies focus on communication as central to the human experience, which involves understanding how people behave in creating, exchanging, and interpreting messages. Today, this accepted discipline now also encompasses more modern forms of communication studies as well, such as gender and communication, intercultural communication, political communication, health communication, and organizational communication.

=== Foundations of the academic discipline ===
The institutionalization of communication studies in U.S. higher education and research has often been traced to Columbia University, the University of Chicago, and the University of Illinois Urbana-Champaign, where early pioneers of the field worked after the Second World War.

Wilbur Schramm is considered the founder of the field of communication studies in the United States. Schramm was hugely influential in establishing communication as a field of study and in forming departments of communication studies across universities in the United States. He was the first individual to identify himself as a communication scholar; he created the first academic degree-granting programs with communication in their name; and he trained the first generation of communication scholars. Schramm had a background in English literature and developed communication studies partly by merging existing programs in speech communication, rhetoric, and journalism. He also edited a textbook, The Process and Effects of Mass Communication (1954), that helped define the field, partly by claiming Paul Lazarsfeld, Harold Lasswell, Carl Hovland, and Kurt Lewin as its founding fathers.

Schramm established three important communication institutes: the Institute of Communications Research (University of Illinois at Urbana-Champaign), the Institute for Communication Research (Stanford University), and the East-West Communication Institute (Honolulu). The patterns of scholarly work in communication studies that were set in motion at these institutes continue to this day. Many of Schramm's students, such as Everett Rogers and David Berlo went on to make important contributions of their own.

The first college of communication was founded at Michigan State University in 1958, led by scholars from Schramm's original ICR and dedicated to studying communication scientifically using a quantitative approach. MSU was soon followed by important departments of communication at Purdue University, University of Texas-Austin, Stanford University, University of Iowa, University of Illinois, University of Pennsylvania, The University of Southern California, and Northwestern University.

Associations related to Communication Studies were founded or expanded during the 1950s. The National Society for the Study of Communication (NSSC) was founded in 1950 to encourage scholars to pursue communication research as a social science. This Association launched the Journal of Communication in the same year as its founding. Like many communication associations founded in this decade, the association's name changed as the field evolved. In 1968 the name changed to the International Communication Association (ICA).

=== In the United States ===
Undergraduate curricula aim to prepare students to interrogate the nature of communication in society and the development of communication as a specific field.

The National Communication Association (NCA) recognizes several distinct but often overlapping specializations within the broader communication discipline, including: technology, critical-cultural, health, intercultural, interpersonal-small group, mass communication, organizational, political, rhetorical, and environmental communication. Students take courses in these subject areas. Other programs and courses often integrated in communication programs include journalism, rhetoric, film criticism, theatre, public relations, political science (e.g., political campaign strategies, public speaking, effects of media on elections), as well as radio, television, computer-mediated communication, film production, and new media.

Many colleges in the United States offer a variety of majors within communication studies, including programs of study in the areas mentioned above. Communication studies is often perceived by many in society as primarily centered on the media arts; however, graduates of communication studies can pursue careers in areas ranging from media arts to public advocacy, marketing, and non-profit organizations.

=== In Canada ===
With the early influence of federal institutional inquiries, notably the 1951 Massey Commission, which "investigated the overall state of culture in Canada", the study of communication in Canada has frequently focused on the development of a cohesive national culture, and on infrastructural empires of social and material circulation. Although influenced by the American Communication tradition and British Cultural Studies, Communication studies in Canada has been more directly oriented toward the state and the policy apparatus, for example the Canadian Radio-television and Telecommunications Commission. Influential thinkers from the Canadian communication tradition include Harold Innis, Marshall McLuhan, Florian Sauvageau, Gertrude Robinson, Marc Raboy, Dallas Smythe, James R. Taylor, François Cooren, Gail Guthrie Valaskakis and George Grant.

Communication studies within Canada are a relatively new discipline, however, there are programs and departments to support and teach this topic in about 13 Canadian universities and many colleges as well. The Communication et information from Laval, and the Canadian Journal of Communication from McGill University in Montréal, are two journals that exist in Canada. There are also organizations and associations, both national and in Québec, that appeal to the specific interests that are targeted towards these academics. These specific journals consist of representatives from the industry of communication, the government, and members of the public as a whole.

== Scope and topics ==
Communication studies integrates aspects of both social sciences and the humanities. As a social science, the discipline overlaps with sociology, psychology, anthropology, biology, political science, economics, and public policy. From a humanities perspective, communication is concerned with rhetoric and persuasion (traditional graduate programs in communication studies trace their history to the rhetoricians of Ancient Greece). Humanities approaches to communication often overlap with history, philosophy, English, and cultural studies.

Communication research informs politicians and policy makers, educators, strategists, legislators, business magnates, managers, social workers, non-governmental organizations, non-profit organizations, and people interested in resolving communication issues in general. There is often a great deal of crossover between social research, cultural research, market research, and other statistical fields.

Recent critiques have focused on the homogeneity of communication scholarship. For example, Chakravartty, et al. (2018) find that white scholars comprise the vast majority of publications, citations, and editorial positions. From a post-colonial perspective, this state is problematic because communication studies engage with a wide range of social justice concerns.

=== Business ===
Business communication emerged as a field of study in the late 20th century, due to the centrality of communication within business relationships. The scope of the field is difficult to define because communication is used in various ways among employers, employees, consumers, and brands. Because of this, the focus of the field is usually placed on the demands of employers, which is more universally understood by the revision of the American Assembly of Collegiate Schools of business standards to emphasize written and oral communication as an important characteristic in the curriculum. Business communication studies, therefore, revolve around the ever changing aspects of written and oral communication directly related to the field of business. Implementation of modern business communication curriculums are enhancing the study of business communication as a whole, while further preparing those to be able to communicate in the business community effectively.

=== Healthcare ===
Health communication is a multidisciplinary field that applies "communication evidence, strategy, theory, and creativity" to advance the well-being of people and populations. The term was first coined in 1975 by the International Communication Association and, in 1997, Health communication was officially recognized in the broader fields of Public Health Education and Health Promotion by the American Public Health Association. The discipline integrates components of various theories and models, with a focus on social marketing. It uses marketing to develop "activities and interventions designed to positively change behaviors". This emergence affected several dynamics of the healthcare system. It raised awareness of various avenues, including promotional activities and communication with health professionals' employees, patients, and constituents. "Efforts to create marketing-oriented organizations called for the widespread dissemination of information", putting a spotlight on theories of "communication, the communication process, and the techniques that were being utilized to communicate in other settings". Now, health care organizations of all types are using things like social media. "Uses include communicating with the community and patients; enhancing organizational visibility; marketing products and services; establishing a venue for acquiring news about activities, promotions, and fund-raising; providing a channel for patient resources and education; and providing customer service and support."

== Professional associations ==
- American Journalism Historians Association (AJHA)
- Association for Education in Journalism and Mass Communication (AEJMC)
- Association for Teachers of Technical Writing (ATTW)
- Black College Communication Association (BCCA)
- Broadcast Education Association (BEA)
- Central States Communication Association (CSCA)
- Council of Communication Associations (CCA)
- European Association for the Teaching of Academic Writing (EATAW)
- European Communication Research and Education Association
- IEEE Professional Communication Society
- International Association for Media and Communications Research
- International Association of Business Communicators (IABC)
- International Communication Association (ICA), an international, academic association for communication studies concerned with all aspects of human and mediated communication
- National Association of Black Journalists: NABJ
- National Association for Media Literacy Education (NAMLE)
- National Communication Association (NCA), professional organization concerned with various aspects of communication studies in the United States
- Philippines Communication Society (PCS) - the professional association of communication practitoners, academics, scholars and researchers in the Philippines.
- Public Relations Society of America (PRSA)
- Rhetoric Society of America (RSA)
- Society for Cinema and Media Studies, an organization for communication research about film studies
- Society for Technical Communication (STC)
- University Film and Video Association, an organization for the study of motion-picture production

== See also ==
- Communication
- Communibiology
- Communication journals
- Communication theory
- Critical theory
- Cultural studies
- Digital rhetoric
- Linguistics
- LGBTQ communication studies
- Outline of communication
- Philosophy of language
- Popular culture studies
- Rhetoric
- Semiotics
- Semiotics of culture
- Text and conversation theory

== Bibliography ==
- Carey, James. 1988 Communication as Culture.
- Cohen, Herman. 1994. The History of Speech Communication: The Emergence of a Discipline, 1914-1945. Annandale, VA: Speech Communication Association.
- Gehrke, Pat J. 2009. The Ethics and Politics of Speech: Communication and Rhetoric in the Twentieth Century. Carbondale, IL: Southern Illinois University Press.
- Gehrke, Pat J. and William M. Keith, eds. 2014. A Century of Communication Studies: The Unfinished Conversation. New York: Routledge.
- Packer, J. & Robertson, C, eds. 2006. Thinking with James Carey: Essays on Communications, Transportation, History.
- Peters, John, Durham, and Peter Simonson, eds. 2004. Mass Communication and American Social Thought: Key Texts 1919-1968.
- Wahl-Jorgensen, Karin 2004, 'How Not to Found a Field: New Evidence on the Origins of Mass Communication Research', Journal of Communication, September 2004.
