= Thorsten Quandt =

German opinion journalist and media scholar

- Education: Ruhr University Bochum
- Occupation: Professor
- Known for: Online communication, journalism research, dark participation

Thorsten Quandt is the professor of online communication at the University of Münster, Germany. He has a particular interest in online communication, (online) journalism and digital media. He (co)authored more than 200 scientific articles and several books, including Participatory Journalism, which was influential in establishing the citizen journalism model. He has edited numerous books, primarily in the field of online communication and digital media, including The Video Game Debate. His work was awarded with several scientific prizes, including international Top Paper Awards, the dissertation award of the German Communication Association, and two ERC grants (European Excellency Programme). Quandt is a fellow of the International Commmunication Association.

== Education and career ==
Quandt graduated with a master's degree in Communication Studies from Ruhr University Bochum. He began teaching in 1998 at the Technical University of Ilmenau, where he received his doctoral degree in 2004. From 2003 to 2007, he worked as a senior researcher at LMU Munich. In 2007 and 2008, he was an assistant professor at the Free University Berlin, and he received his habilitation from LMU in 2008. In 2009, he obtained the chair of Interactive Media and Online Communication from the University of Hohenheim, where he also served as the Director of the Institute of Communication Studies. Since 2012, he has been the chair for online communication at the University of Münster, Germany. Quandt has given lectures at various other universities, and was a visiting professor at Stanford University, the University of Oxford, the University of California, Santa Barbara, the University of British Columbia and a visiting researcher at the Indiana University, Bloomington.

Quandt is the founding chair of the "Digital Games Research" section of the European Communication Research and Education Association (ECREA), and a member of the executive board of ECREA. He was an associate editor of the Journal of Communication. He is a board member of the Journal of Communication, as well as the journals Communication Theory and Digital Journalism. He has been the secretary of the Journalism Studies Division in the International Communication Association (ICA), and the chairman of the Journalism Studies Division in the German Communication Association. In 2023, Quandt was named a Fellow of the ICA.

Quandt has been a member of various boards and committees, including committees of the Deutsche Forschungsgemeinschaft (DFG), the European Research Council, the Academy of Finland, the Helsingin Sanomat Foundation, ECREA, the German Communication Association DGPuK, and he worked as a reviewer for numerous scientific journals. He received several international and national research awards, as well as two ERC grants (European excellency programme). He was nominated twice on the top list of "40 most significant young scientists in Germany" by the national trade journal Capital.

== Research fields ==
Quandt's work is focusing the impact and social aspects of digital games use, participatory journalism, and risk factors of online communication, like online and video game addiction, media induced aggression and cyberbullying. While Quandt's work is also focusing the problematic side of digital media use, he asks for a neutral and balanced perspective on media use, including positive aspects of use. Quandt argues that research on digital media has to 'normalize' and move beyond a state of repeating moral panics. He is one of the authors of an open debate paper to the WHO, criticizing the introduction of Gaming Disorder as a "disorder due to addictive behaviors" in the 11th edition of the International Classification of Diseases, which they see as a result of a "moral panic around the harm of video gaming". The authors mention several "fundamental issues" of Gaming Disorder in their paper, which triggered a public debate.

Quandt's large-scale, representative survey studies on online gamers were widely cited, as they did not support the popular notion of notable differences between gamers and non-gamers. This is especially true for his analyses on digital games addiction that showed a relatively low level of stable problematic behavior. His team's work on sexism among gamers was picked up by the international press and gamers alike, as the measured differences between gamers and non-gamers in the study were marginal. The research was also discussed in relation to the gamergate controversy. However, Quandt and colleagues pointed out that their research does not necessarily prove the non-existence of sexism in specific gamer groups or the content itself, but that it rather supports the notion that gaming has become mainstream entertainment in modern societies thus approaching an average level of sexism.

In an interdisciplinary project on the analysis of social bots and their use in online propaganda, Quandt and colleagues developed computer-supported and automatic identification methods. During the project, they observed the German elections 2017. The team identified attempts at manipulating the public, including an unsuccessful Twitter attack on the electoral debate between chancellor Merkel and the social-democrat Schulz. The attackers were identified by journalists as a right-wing extremist group called Reconquista Germanica.

Quandt has led several projects on the identification of disinformation in online communication, and coined the term Dark Participation as an umbrella concept for phenomena like online disinformation, hate speech, trolling and bullying.

== Selected books ==
- Kowert, R. & Quandt, T. (Eds.) (2015). The video game debate. Unravelling the physical, social, and psychological effects of digital games. New York, London: Routledge.
- Quandt, T., & Kröger, S. (Eds.) (2014). Multiplayer: The social aspects of digital gaming. London: Routledge.
- Singer, J., Hermida, A., Domingo, D., Heinonen, A., Paulussen, S., Quandt, T., Reich, Z., & Vujnovic, M. (2011). Participatory journalism: Guarding open gates at online newspapers. Malden, Oxford, Chichester: Wiley-Blackwell.

Selected journal publications

- Quandt, Thorsten (2018). "Dark participation". Media and Communication. 6 (4): 36–48. doi:10.17645/mac.v6i4.1519.
- Scharkow, M.; Festl, R.; Quandt, T. (2014). "Longitudinal patterns of problematic computer game use among adolescents and adults: a 2-year panel study". Addiction. 109 (11): 1910–1917. doi:10.1111/add.12662. PMID 24938480.
- Festl, R.; Quandt, T. (2013). "Social relations and cyberbullying: The influence of individual and structural attributes on victimization and perpetration via the Internet". Human Communication Research. 39 (1): 101–126. doi:10.1111/j.1468-2958.2012.01442.x. S2CID 145746357.
- Quandt, T (2012). "What's left of trust in a network society? An evolutionary model and critical discussion of trust and societal communication". European Journal of Communication. 27 (1): 7–21. doi:10.1177/0267323111434452. S2CID 59417719.
- Domingo, D.; Quandt, T.; Heinonen, A.; Paulussen, S.; Singer, J.; Vujnovic, M. (2008). "Participatory journalism practices in the media and beyond: an international comparative study of initiatives in online newspapers" (PDF). Journalism Practice. 2 (3): 326–342. doi:10.1080/17512780802281065. S2CID 8444445.
- Quandt, T (2008). "(No) News on the World Wide Web? A comparative content analysis of online news in Europe and the United States". Journalism Studies. 9 (5): 717–738. doi:10.1080/14616700802207664. S2CID 141902685.
- Quandt, T.; Löffelholz, M.; Weaver, D.; Hanitzsch, T.; Altmeppen, K.-D. (2006). "American and German online journalists at the beginning of the 21st century: A bi-national survey". Journalism Studies. 7 (2): 171–186. doi:10.1080/14616700500533486. S2CID 142852084.
