= Radhika Parameswaran =

Radhika Parmeswaran holds an endowed Herman B. Wells chair at Indiana University, Bloomington. A professor and former chair of journalism there, Parameswaran has published in leading journals, contributing to analysis of the ways in which colonialism, nationalism and globalization shape the social construction of modernity and gender.

== Background ==
Parameswaran grew up in a city located in the southern part of India known as Hyderabad. She received a Masters in Media Studies at Texas Christian University in the United States and a Masters in Communication and Journalism from Osmania University in India. She also received her Ph.D. in Mass Communication with a minor in gender studies at the University of Iowa.

== Scholarly work ==
Parameswaran is the author of two monograph articles, and she has published 27 journal articles and 13 book chapters. Her articles have been published in the following journals: Global Media & Communication, Journal of Communication, Journal of Children & Media, Communication, Culture & Critique, Journal of Communication Inquiry, Critical Studies in Media Communication, Communication Theory, Qualitative Inquiry, Communication Review, and Frontiers: A Journal of Women Studies. She was also the editor-in-chief of the academic journal, Communication, Culture & Critique, from 2014 to 2016.

Her two monographs are in the journal, Journalism & Communication Monographs, which is an official publication of the Association of Education in Journalism and Mass Communication (AEJMC). These monographs touch on some of her main research topics. In her article, "Global media events in India: Contests over beauty, gender, and nation," Parameswaran studied how global beauty pageants affect non-western countries. The theory of cultural imperialism suggests that dominant western ideals can overtake other nations. Parameswaran shows that the relationship is more complicated. Local national and regional ideals can get woven into global ideals, allowing both sides to influence each other's values, and standards. Gender, beauty standards, and cultural politics also show that intersectionality shapes flows of western culture to non-western locations. In the other monograph, "Melanin on the margins: Advertising and the cultural politics of fair/light/white beauty in India", Parameswaran and Cardoza studied how companies advertise and entice women to buy skin lightening products. Many magazines and advertisements in India show that light skin is beautiful and they reinforce that normative expectation, particularly for Indian women. Hierarchies of race, gender, caste, ethnicity, and class modify and create spaces of privilege and marginalization within beauty culture.

== Other contributions ==
In addition to being the editor-in-chief of Communication, Culture & Critique, Parameswaran was also a Volume Editor for The International Encyclopedia of Media Studies, a seven volume set. She was the editor for the volume, Audience and Interpretation. For her scholarly work, Parameswaran received various awards over the years. She received the 2015 Teresa Award for outstanding feminist research from the International Communication Association. She has also been awarded six top research paper awards. Five have been awarded from the Association for Education in Journalism and Mass Communication and one has been from the International Communication Association. Indiana University has also recognized her work. She was awarded with the Trustees Teaching Award in the School of Journalism in the spring semester of 2009 and the Gretchen Kemp Teaching Award for Outstanding Teaching in the School of Journalism at Indiana University two times, both in 2011 and in 2002.

She has been quoted by various news outlets regarding colorism and skin whitening.

== See also ==
- Postcolonialism
