= Mark L. Knapp =

American academic

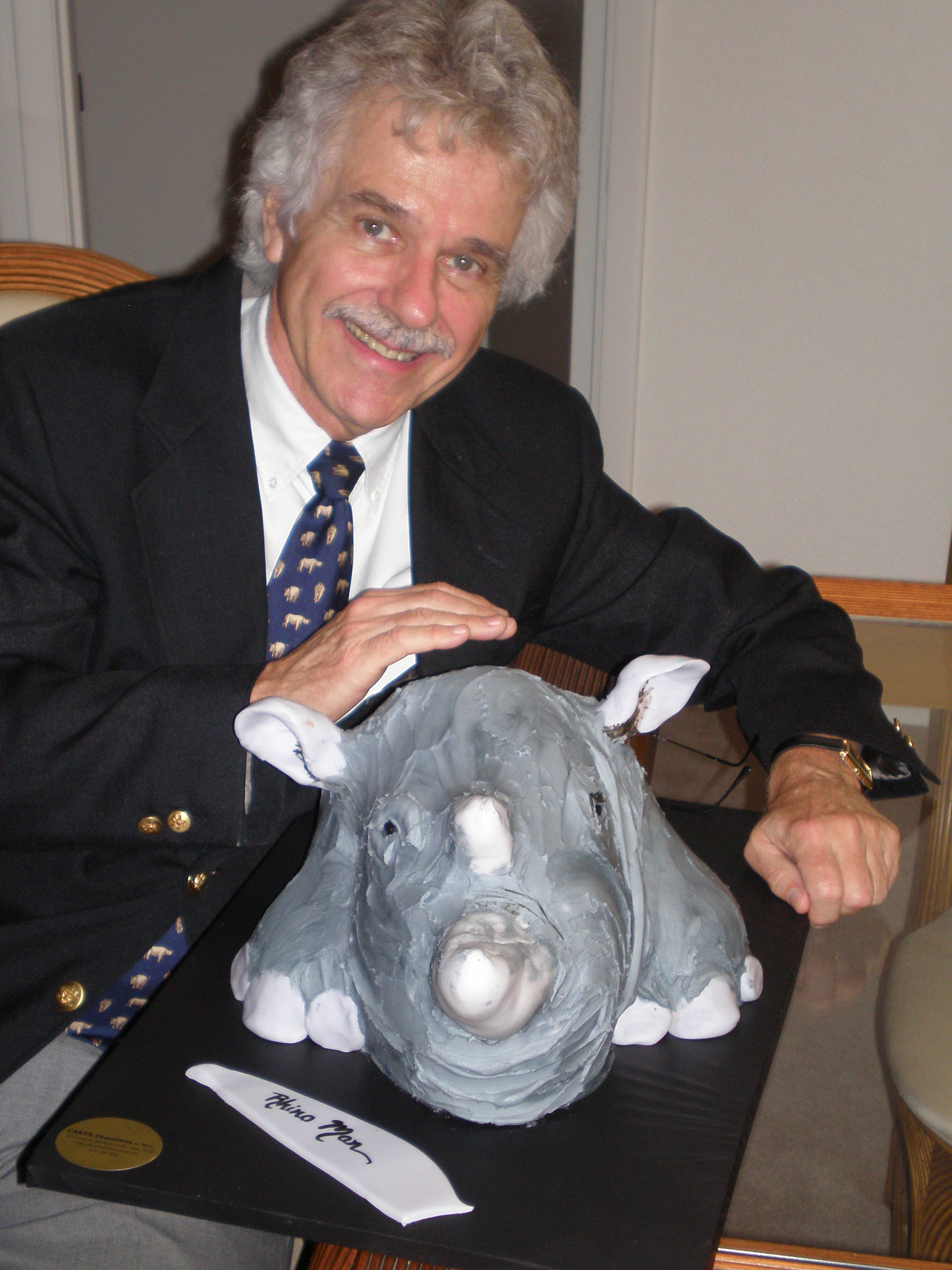
- Knapp with rhino cake
- Born: July 12, 1938
- Occupation: Emeritus Professor
- Website: UT Austin Profile

Mark L. Knapp is the Jesse H. Jones Centennial Professor Emeritus and a Distinguished Teaching Professor Emeritus at the University of Texas at Austin. He is internationally known for his research and writing on nonverbal communication and communication in developing relationships. He has also done research and published books on lying and deception. The Mark L. Knapp Award for career contributions to the study of interpersonal communication is awarded annually by the National Communication Association. The Mark L. Knapp Professorship, Moody College of Communication, University of Texas at Austin, was established in 2017.

Knapp served in the United States Army in Germany from 1957 to 1959, received his bachelor’s (1962) and master’s (1963) degrees from the University of Kansas and his PhD (1966) from Pennsylvania State University. He was employed at the University of Wisconsin–Milwaukee (1965–1970); Purdue University (1970–1980); the State University of New York at New Paltz (1980–1983); the University of Vermont (1983); and the University of Texas at Austin (1983–2008). He received an Outstanding Alumni Award from the Department of Communication Arts and Sciences, Pennsylvania State University in 2018.

He served as the editor of Human Communication Research (1980–1983); was an Eastern Communication Association Scholar (1982-1983); was a Fellow in the International Communication Association (1980); and was recognized as Distinguished Scholar in the National Communication Association (1993).

Knapp received teaching awards from the Central States Speech Association (1969), the University of Wisconsin-Milwaukee (1969), Purdue University (1974), SUNY-New Paltz (1983), the University of Texas at Austin (1987, 1993, 1999, 2002) and the National Communication Association (2004).

He was the President of the International Communication Association (1975–1976); the National Communication Association (1989–1990); the Association for Communication Administrators (1996–1997); and the University of Texas at Austin chapter of the honor society of Phi Kappa Phi (2001–2003). He was the Chair of the Department of Speech Communication (1989–1996) and the Department of Communication Studies (2000–2001) at the University of Texas at Austin.

Knapp examined a wide variety of topics in his published research, including: conversational narcissism, behaviors enacted in greetings, goodbyes, and conversational turn-taking, memorable messages, regrettable messages, messages people attach to their email signatures, compliments, play behavior, the construct of intent, anti-drug abuse commercials, communication in developing relationships, nonverbal and deceptive behavior in close relationships, communicating commitment in close relationships, couples’ personal idioms, the effects of interaction on appearance, nonverbal communication and aging, communicating with the terminally ill, staff-resident communication in nursing homes, and the measurement of conflict in organizations.

He has lectured to, trained, and/or acted as consultant to over 60 different business organizations, voluntary groups, government agencies, and educational institutions—including IBM, U.S. Peace Corps, Pfizer, and the Texas Attorney General's Office.
