= Boston University Division of Emerging Media Studies =

The Division of Emerging Media Studies (DEMS) is a department within Boston University's College of Communication (COM). Founded in 2012, DEMS is headed up by James E. Katz, BU's Feld professor of Emerging Media. The multidisciplinary program focuses on new media and emerging media technologies, addressing the adaptive use of new technologies, and the effects they have on users. It is currently offers two degree programs - a Master of Arts and a Doctorate in Emerging Media Studies. The program works closely with the Center for Mobile Communication Studies

In Fall 2014, the DEMS welcomed its inaugural class of nine masters students. The masters program is one year long (fall, spring, and a summer semester), and at the end, students will have experience conducting original research, managing a project, and developing other technical skills. The first cohort of Doctoral students will begin their study in Fall 2015.
