= Linda Putnam =

American communication scholar

Linda L. Putnam
- Born: Linda L. Putnam
- Occupations: Scholar and author
- Employer: University of California, Santa Barbara
- Title: Distinguished Professor Emerita
- Awards: 2021 Doctorat honoris causa (Université de Montréal); 2022 Honorary Doctorate (Aalto University, Helsinki, Finland)

Academic background
- Education: Hardin–Simmons University (B.A.); University of Wisconsin–Madison (M.A.); University of Minnesota (Ph.D.)
- Thesis: (1977)
- Influences: Karl Weick, Gregory Bateson, Aubrey Fisher

Academic work
- Discipline: Communication
- Sub-discipline: Organizational communication, conflict management, negotiation, gender & organizations
- Institutions: Purdue University; Texas A&M University; University of California, Santa Barbara
- Notable works: The SAGE Handbook of Organizational Discourse (2004); Organizational Communication (5-volume set) (2006); Building Theories of Organizations: The Constitutive Role of Communication (2009)
- Website: comm.ucsb.edu/people/linda-l-putnam

Linda Putnam is an American scholar and professor in the Department of Communication at the University of California, Santa Barbara. She is known for her theories on organizational communication and her publications focused on conflict management and negotiation, discourse and interaction analysis and organizational paradoxes and dilemmas. Her early work fostered the interpretive turn in the field, as an approach that focuses on sense-making, language, and meaning. This research led to the 1993 Charles H. Woolbert Award from the National Communication Association for original research that had stood the test of time. The Organizational Communication Division of the International Communication Association (ICA) named its Linda L. Putnam Early Career Award after her. Putnam is a past-president of the International Association for Conflict Management (1993-1994), the ICA (2000-2003), and the Council of Communication Associations (2000-2002).

Putnam has conducted studies on multiparty environmental disputes, negotiation teams, and labor conflicts. Her discourse studies are focused heavily on tensions and contradictions and also incorporate metaphors, narratives, discursive framing, and arguments. Putnam's work also focuses on the contradictions within the arenas of work-life issues within organizations, organizational change and open office environments.

== Education ==
Putnam attended Hardin-Simmons University, where she graduated with a Bachelor of Arts in speech communication in 1967. One year later she was awarded a Master of Arts from the University of Wisconsin-Madison and in 1977, received a Ph.D. in speech communications with a minor in management and psychology from the University of Minnesota.

== Career ==
Putnam began teaching in 1977 at Purdue University. In 1993, she joined the faculty in Texas A&M University's Department of Speech Communication and later became the department's head. Her courses focused on a variety of topics that include communication and conflict management, discourse analysis in organizations, and gender and organizations. In 2005, Putnam received the George T. and Gladys H. Abell Professorship from the College of Liberal Arts and in 2006 Putnam was recognized as a Regents' Professor at Texas A&M University for her research and teaching. The following year Putnam took a position with the University of California Santa Barbara's communications department, where she, as of 2025, serves as a Distinguished Professor Emerita.

In 2015, Putnam was named the Faculty Research Lecturer at the UCSB, the highest honor bestowed by the campus’s Academic Senate. She was recognized for her global reputation as a leading scholar in organizational communication, conflict negotiation, and bargaining. Her academic leadership includes directing the conflict and dispute resolution program at Texas A&M University's George Bush School of Government and Public Service. Putnam also presided over the Council of Communication Associations from 2000 to 2002.

In 1995, she was inducted as a fellow or the International Communication Association and in 2017, she became a fellow of the International Association of Conflict Management (IACM).

In 2024, Putnam was inducted as a fellow of the Academy of Management in recognition of her lifelong contributions to organizational communication, negotiation, and conflict management scholarship. She co-founded the Academy's Conflict Management Division, served on its Board of Governors, and received the 2011 Distinguished Service Award. Also, in 2024, she established the Putnam Interdisciplinary Scholar Award at UCSB, creating an endowment to provide an annual honorarium that supports communication graduate students who conduct outstanding interdisciplinary research.

== Communication theory and research ==
Putnam's research has used a communication lens to study organizational conflict, contradictions, and negotiations. Her early research on teachers’ negotiation examined how the communication of issues and agenda items changed over time and led to a settlement. Her research on the 2007-2008 Writers Guild Strike focused on how the crafting of press releases and blogs framed or cast the issues and parties in the conflict. This work showed that broadening the contextual boundaries of a conflict helped opposing parties find common ground. She has also investigated "conflict framing in multiparty environmental disputes, especially in the ways that different stakeholders make sense of complex, seemingly intractable conflicts".

=== Paradox Theory in Organizations ===
Drawing on conflict as ironically both competition and cooperation, Putnam’s recent work focuses on paradox theory and organizations. In particular, she brings a communication lens to examine how tensions and contradictions surface in everyday organizational situations, such as diversity in the workplace and technological change. Embracing a dialectical model, she examines how multiple paradoxical tensions form patterns that can lead to entrapment, vicious cycles, or transformation. In addition, she shows how organizational actors can break destructive patterns through employing paradoxical thinking and different response repertoires, for example, reframing, transcending opposites, and reconstructing narratives. She has applied this theory to contradictions that emerge in navigating fluid workspaces, organizational crises, and work-life dilemmas.

== Awards and honors ==
- 1999 Distinguished Scholar Award from the National Communication Association
- 2005 Steven H. Chaffee Career Productivity Award from the International Communication Association
- 2010 Lifetime Achievement Award from the International Association for Conflict Management
- 2011 Distinguished Service Award from the Academy of Management Association
- 2012 Lifetime Achievement Award from Management Communication Quarterly for contributions to the field of organizational communication
- 2012 Samuel L. Becker Distinguished Service Award from National Communication Association
- 2017 Fellow of the International Communication Association
- 2021 Doctorat honoris causa from the Université de Montréal.
- 2024 Fellow of the Academy of Management Association
- Lifetime Achievement Award from the International Association for Conflict Management

== Selected publications ==
=== Edited books ===
- Grant, D., Hardy, C., Oswick, C., & Putnam, L. (Eds.). (2004). The SAGE Handbook of Organizational Discourse. London, Sage, 911 pp.
- Putnam, L. L., & Krone, K. J. (Eds.). (2006). Organizational Communication (5 volume set). Sage Major Works Series. London: Sage Publications. Vol. 1-- 410, pp.; Vol. 2-- 358 pp., Vol. 3--90 pp.; Vol. 4--399 pp.; Vol. 5--406 pp.
- Putnam, L. L., & Nicotera, A. M. (Eds.). (2009). Building Theories of Organizations: The Constitutive Role of Communication. New York: Routledge/Taylor Francis, 222 pp.
- Grant, D., Hardy, C., & Putnam, L. L. (Eds.). (2011). Organizational Discourse Studies (3 volume set). Sage Major Works Series. Los Angeles, CA: Sage Publications. Vol. 1–373, pp.; Vol. 2—442 pp.; Vol. 3—427 pp.
- Putnam, L. L., & Mumby, D.K. (Eds.). (2014). The SAGE Handbook of Organizational Communication: Advances in Theory, Research, and Methods (3rd ed.). Los Angeles, CA: Sage Publications, 837 pp.
- Örtenblad, A., Trehan, K., & Putnam, L. L. (Eds.). (2017). Exploring Morgan's Metaphors: Theory, Research, and Practice. Los Angeles, CA: Sage Publications, 260 pp.
- Fairhurst, G. T., & Putnam, L. L. (2024). Performing Organizational Paradoxes. New York: Routledge/Taylor Francis, 233 pp.

=== Articles ===
- Putnam, L. L., & Wilson, C. E. (1982). Communicative strategies in organizational conflicts: Reliability and validity of a measurement scale. Annals of the International Communication Association, 6(1), 629-652. doi:10.1080/23808985.1982.11678515
- Fairhurst, G. T., & Putnam, L. (2004). Organizations as discursive constructions. Communication theory, 14(1), 5-26. doi:10.1111/j.1468-2885.2004.tb00301.x
- Dewulf, A., Gray, B., Putnam, L., Lewicki, R., Aarts, N., Bouwen, R., & Van Woerkum, C. (2009). Disentangling approaches to framing in conflict and negotiation research: A meta-paradigmatic perspective. Human relations, 62(2), 155-193. doi:10.1177/0018726708100356
- Putnam, L. L., Myers, K. K., & Gailliard, B. M. (2014). Examining the tensions in workplace flexibility and exploring options for new directions. Human relations, 67(4), 413-440. doi:10.1177/0018726713495704
- Putnam, L. L., Fairhurst, G. T., & Banghart, S. (2016). Contradictions, dialectics, and paradoxes in organizations: A constitutive approach. Academy of Management Annals, 10(1), 65-171. doi:10.5465/19416520.2016.1162421

=== Book chapters ===
- Mumby, D. K., Putnam, L. L., & Fineman, S. (1993). Organizations, emotion and the myth of rationality. Emotion in Organizations, 1st ed., Sage, London.
- Putnam, L. L., Phillips, N., & Chapman, P. (1999). Metaphors of communication and organization. Managing organizations: Current issues, 125-158.
