= Intercultural dialogue =

Intercultural dialogue (ICD) is an interaction between people that have different cultural backgrounds who intend to acknowledge those differences and learn from one another.

== Etymology ==
The term builds upon the concept of dialogue, which refers to at least two people holding a conversation. And it builds upon the term intercultural, which is typically used to refer to people communicating across differences in nationality, race and ethnicity, or religion.

"Dialogue" has several meanings: it sometimes refers to dialogue in a script, which simply means people talking, but more often it refers to "a quality of communication characterized by the participants' willingness and ability simultaneously to be radically open to the other(s) and to articulate their own views. ... Dialogue's primary goal is understanding rather than agreement."

== Definitions ==
Peter Praxmarer supplied a concise definition: "intercultural dialogue is the art and science of understanding the Other". The Council of Europe proposed a definition in 2008, for the European Year of Intercultural Dialogue, emphasizing the deliberate nature of intercultural dialogue:

Intercultural dialogue is a process that comprises an open and respectful exchange or interaction between individuals, groups and organisations with different cultural backgrounds or world views. Among its aims are: to develop a deeper understanding of diverse perspectives and practices; to increase participation and the freedom and ability to make choices; to foster equality; and to enhance creative processes.

== Related concepts ==
Intercultural dialogue is closely related to intercultural communication, which describes any interaction between members of different cultural groups. Intercultural dialogue typically is a more deliberate process intended to understand someone having a different background, and therefore different assumptions.

Interfaith dialogue, also called interreligious dialogue, is a form of intercultural dialogue that focuses on conversations between members of different religions. Interfaith dialogues assume that the participants wish to understand other religious viewpoints. It is narrower than intercultural dialogue, because a religion is one possible form of cultural identity.

Intergroup dialogue refers to any time members of groups having different identities talk. It is broader than intercultural dialogue, because cultural identity is one type of possible identity.

== Uses ==
Intercultural dialogue has been used as a tool for increasing understanding in contexts where misunderstandings typically occur. For example, the European Agency for Culture was established by EU members to coordinate intercultural dialogue activities, "focussing on the integration of migrants and refugees in societies through the arts and culture". Zofia Wilk-Woś showed how the European Commission "considers intercultural dialogue as one of the main instruments of peace and conflict prevention" and that "making people aware of the cultural diversity as well as the need for intercultural dialogue are the most important issues". Communication scholars Benjamin Broome and Mary Jane Collier have argued for the critical role of intercultural dialogue in peacemaking.

Outside of politics and diplomacy, intercultural dialogue has often been an explicit focus within educational contexts, with the goal being either to foster intercultural dialogue on campus or to promote intercultural dialogue in the surrounding communities. Universities have especially often been assumed to be the obvious places where discussions of and training in intercultural dialogue occur.

Anna-Leena Riitaoja and Fred Dervin posed the following questions as essential when studying interreligious dialogue, and these are also obvious questions for any who want to understand intercultural dialogue:

- Who is going to learn about whom, and whose knowledge is to be learnt?
- Does the other have an opportunity to be seen and heard as a subject or relegated to a subaltern position?
- Are knowledge and understanding about her constructed with her and in her own terms?
- Will a religious 'subaltern' ever be equal to the majority in schools?

Many projects intended to facilitate and encourage intercultural dialogues have used existing spaces, especially museums or libraries, as a focus of activities. An example is The Human Library, a project started by a group in Copenhagen, Denmark. On a specific day in their local library, patrons are able to speak informally with "people on loan", chosen to represent the diversity of the local community, who answer any question asked in a neutral setting. The project was so successful it has been duplicated around the world, and beyond libraries into other contexts (museums, festivals, schools).

== Centers ==
There are multiple organizations titled Center for Intercultural Dialogue or some variation on that, around the world, each having a different mandate and audience. The Center for Intercultural Dialogue in the USA is sponsored by the Council of Communication Associations, and helps to connect researchers, teachers, and practitioners. The Center for Intercultural Dialogue based in Macedonia emphasizes youth projects. The Center for Intercultural Dialogue and Translation in Egypt translates Arab media publications. The KAICIID Dialogue Centre, formally the King Abdullah bin Abdulaziz International Centre for Interreligious and Intercultural Dialogue, originally based in Vienna, Austria, recently moved to Lisbon, Portugal, is a Saudi Arabian non-profit. The Cuernavaca Center for Intercultural Dialogue on Development is a Christian retreat in Mexico. The Anna Lindh Euro-Mediterranean Foundation for the Dialogue Between Cultures based in Egypt is a network of civil society organizations dedicated to promoting intercultural dialogue in the Mediterranean. And Akdim, Antalya Intercultural Dialogue Center, is a Turkish nonprofit intended to improve cross-cultural awareness.

== Online resources ==
The Anna Lindh Euro-Mediterranean Foundation for the Dialogue Between Cultures launched the Intercultural Dialogue Resource Centre in 2020. The goal is to make research, good practices, learning activities, expertise and events on intercultural dialogue in the Euro-Mediterranean accessible to everyone. The Centre contains information on more than 100 curated academic publications and the biographies and contact information for 100 experts. It also offers visitors a selection of journalistic articles, events, learning activities developed especially for civil society and around 30 good practices presenting successful projects addressing a variety of issues relating to intercultural encounters, trends and affairs in the Euro-Mediterranean region.

UNESCO created an E-platform for Intercultural Dialogue in 2018, intended "to promote good practices from all over the world, that enable to build bridges between people from diverse backgrounds in order to create more inclusive societies through mutual understanding and respect for diversity". One major section presents a concept glossary, from intercultural dialogue to cultural identity to intercultural citizenship drawn from Intercultural Competences: A Conceptual and Operational Framework published in 2013.

The Center for Intercultural Dialogue in the US has a website intended to serve as a clearinghouse, with information on everything from publication opportunities to conferences to collaborative opportunities, readings to podcasts to videotapes, jobs to fellowships to postdocs. Profiles of 250 people interested in intercultural dialogue, and links to over 300 organizations around the world sharing goals have been published on the site. A list of hundreds of publications on the topic of intercultural dialogue is also available. The Center produces a series of online publications: Key Concepts in Intercultural Dialogue, one-page introductions to essential vocabulary (such as KC1: Intercultural Dialogue) which are being translated into nearly three dozen languages; Constructing Intercultural Dialogues, case studies of actual interactions; CID Posters, which present concepts visually, also translated into multiple languages; In Dialogue: CID Occasional Papers, for longer discussions; and Intercultural Dialogue Exercises, which provide details for exercises of various lengths for various audiences intended to encourage intercultural dialogue.

=== UNITWIN / UNESCO Chairs ===
UNITWIN is the abbreviation for UNESCO's university twinning and networking system. The program

promotes international cooperation and networking between universities. It helps reinforce higher education institutions worldwide, bridge the knowledge gap, mobilize university expertise and collaborate around the Sustainable Development Agenda 2030. Launched in 1992, the programme supports the establishment of UNESCO Chairs and UNITWIN Networks in key priority areas related to UNESCO's fields of competence – education, natural and social sciences, culture and communication. Today, the network comprises more than 830 UNESCO Chairs and UNITWIN cooperation programmes in over 110 UNESCO Member States.

Within UNITWIN, there are dozens of UNESCO Chairs in intercultural dialogue, under a variety of variations on the name. The First Academic Forum of UNESCO Chairs on Intercultural and Interreligious Dialogue was held in 2015. The Second Academic Forum was held in 2017, and the Third Academic Forum in 2019.

== See also ==
- Social dialogue
- World Day for Cultural Diversity for Dialogue and Development
