= Center for Intercultural Dialogue (disambiguation) =

The Center for Intercultural Dialogue is an academic organization founded in 2010 by the Council of Communication Associations, a United States non-profit designed to encourage research on intercultural dialogue.

Center for Intercultural Dialogue may also refer to:

- Akdim, Antalya Intercultural Dialogue Center, Turkish nonprofit founded in 2005 to promote intercultural dialogue
- Anna Lindh Euro-Mediterranean Foundation for the Dialogue Between Cultures, founded in 2005 by Euromed, as a network of civil society organizations dedicated to promoting intercultural dialogue in the Mediterranean region, and based in Egypt
- KAICIID Dialogue Centre, formally the King Abdullah bin Abdulaziz International Centre for Interreligious and Intercultural Dialogue, a Saudi Arabian non-profit originally based in Austria, and now based in Portugal
