= Richard Ling =

American communications scholar (born 1954)

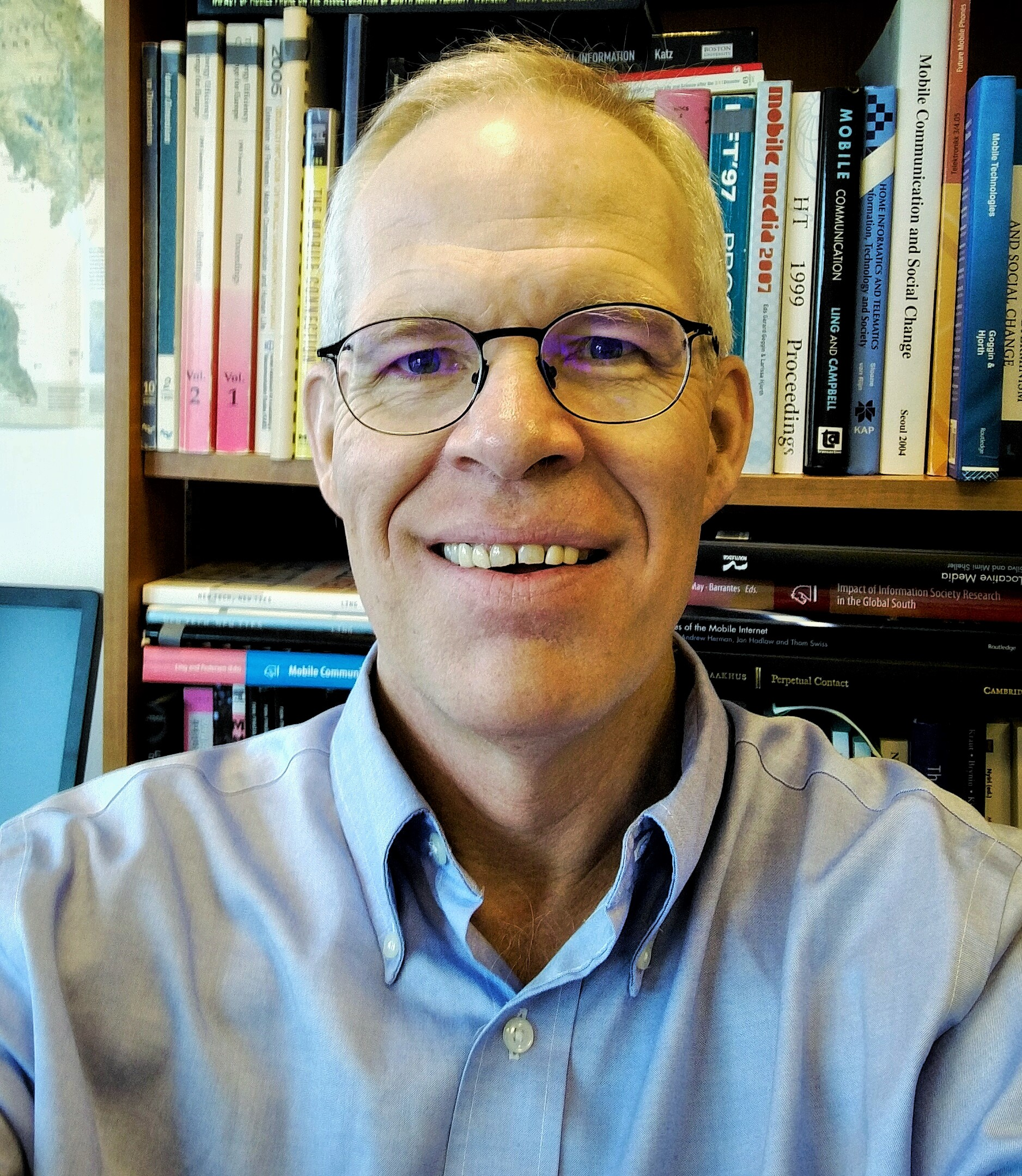
- Born: July 19, 1954 (age 72); Denver, Colorado
- Education: University of Colorado, Boulder
- Known for: Analysis of the social consequences of mobile telephony
- Awards: Member of The Norwegian Academy of Science and Letters (Det Norske Vitenskaps Akademi, Member of Academia Europaea, Fellow of the International Communication Association, International Communication Association CROF Prize (2010), Media Ecology Association Erving Goffman Award (2010)
- Scientific career
- Fields: Sociology, Communication
- Workplaces: Nanyang Technological University, Singapore, Telenor

Richard Ling, also known as Rich Ling, is a prominent communications scholar specializing in mobile communication. He held the position of Shaw Foundation Professor of Media Technology at Nanyang Technological University, Singapore, from 2013 to 2021. Having lived and worked in Norway, Ling has extensively researched the social implications of mobile communication, text messaging and mobile telephony. His work focuses on how mobile communication enables "micro-coordination" among teenagers and fosters social cohesion among generations. Recently, he has explored this phenomenon in the context of large databases and developing countries. Ling has published numerous papers on this topic and is widely cited. He was honored as a Fellow of the International Communication Association in 2016 and appointed editor of the Journal of Computer-Mediated Communication in 2017. As a retiree Ling engaged in environmental work with the Norwegian organization Besteforeldres Kilmaaksjonen.

== Biography ==
Rich Ling, a fourth-generation Colorado native, grew up near Brighton, Colorado. He earned his Ph.D. in sociology from the University of Colorado, Boulder, in 1984. He has held teaching positions at the University of Wyoming in Laramie, IT University of Copenhagen and most recently, Nanyang Technological University in Singapore. Additionally, he has worked as a researcher for the Norwegian telecommunications company Telenor.

Ling has resided in Scandinavia, specifically Norway, for over twenty years. He was a member of the Gruppen for Ressursstudier ("the resource study group") established by Jørgen Randers and partner at Ressurskonsult, a consulting firm that explores the intersection of energy, technology, and society. Additionally, he was part of the Telenor R&D team and maintains an ongoing connection. He has also held the position of Pohs visiting professor of Communication Studies at the University of Michigan in Ann Arbor, where he retains an adjunct position.

In 2012, Richard Ling founded the journal, Mobile Media and Communication, published by SAGE and currently serves as co-editor. He is also the founding co-editor of the Oxford University Press series on mobile communication. Additionally, he has held the position of Editor-in-Chief of the Journal of Computer-Mediated Communication.

Ling moved to Singapore in 2014, where he held an endowed chair in the Wee Kim Wee School of Communication and Information at Nanyang Technological University. He headed a research team that focuses on mobile communication in Myanmar and elsewhere in Southeast Asia.

== Work ==
Ling is renowned for his work on the social consequences of mobile communication. His concept of micro-coordination, as outlined in "Hyper-coordination via Mobile Phones in Norway" (co-authored with Birgitte Yttri), describes a significant social impact of mobile communication's widespread adoption in society. Additionally, he has demonstrated how mobile communication enhances social cohesion within small groups and has become an integral part of societal structure.

His book Taken for Grantedness (MIT Press 2012) explores how mobile communication has become an integral part of society, similar to mechanical timekeeping, and was reviewed in the journal Science. His earlier book, New Tech, New Ties (MIT press 2008), won the 2009 Goffman Award from the Media Ecology Association. Ling also authored The Mobile Connection (Morgan Kaufmann), a comprehensive examination of the social consequences of mobile telephony and co-authored Mobile Phones and Mobile Communication with Jonathan Donner.

Ling is a founding co-editor of the SAGE journal Mobile Media and Communication (along with Veronika Karnowski, Thilo von Pape and Steve Jones). In 2017 he was named editor-in-chief of the Journal of Computer-Mediated Communication. He is also a founding editor (along with Gerard Goggin and Leopoldina Fortunati) of the Oxford University Press series on mobile communication. He has been the co-editor, along with Scott Campbell, of the Mobile Communication Research Series. He is an associate editor for journals The Information Society, the Journal of Computer-Mediated Communication, the Journal of Communication as well as Information Technology and International Development. Ling has received recognition as an outstanding scholar from the International Communication Association (The 2010 CROF Award), Rutgers University, and the Telenor Research Award in 2009. He has been interviewed on The Discovery Channel, National Public Radio and Norwegian TV as well as for periodicals such as The New York Times, The Economist, the Los Angeles Times, Der Spiegel, Newsweek, Época (Brazil), Wired, Toronto's The Globe and Mail, Norwegian publications such as Aftenposten, VG, and Dagbladet and Danish publications such as Politiken.
