= James Katz =

James Katz may refer to:

- James C. Katz, American film historian and preservationist
- James E. Katz, communication scholar
