= Vicki Mayer =

Vicki Mayer (b. 1971) is an American academic. She is Professor of Communication at Tulane University, where she has served as the Associate Dean for Academic Initiatives from 2018 to 2024 and held the Louise Riggio Chair for Social Entrepreneurship and Social Innovation from 2014 to 2019. She is Senior Advisor to the Dean of Liberal Arts.

Mayer researches media production and consumption, specifically relating to economic and political transformations in creative and communications industries. Her research interests include media audiences, production studies and communication labor, citizenship and culture, Latin American and Latino media, and alternative and community media. Mayer's most downloaded article on the internet explores the origins and performance of ‘flashing’ in New Orleans.

== Professional memberships ==
Mayer is a member of the International Communication Association, National Communication Association, Society for Cinema and Media Studies, and the Latin American Studies Association.

== Education and academic career ==
Mayer grew up in Kansas before pursuing an independent major “Journalism in the Third World: A Critical Re-appraisal” and Brazilian Studies at Brown University in 1993. She then studied at the University of California, San Diego. She received an M.A. in Communication in 1997 and a PhD in Communication in the year 2000.

Mayer is fluent in English, Portuguese and Spanish. She has single-authored three books and has edited 4 volumes, including an encyclopedia volume for Blackwell on Media Production. She designs and teaches various courses at Tulane University, including Media Analysis, Technology Analysis, Alternative Journalism and Media Histories.

== Published work ==
Mayer's research is publicly available on Academia.edu and through an archival site she co-created called ViaNolaVie, which was a partnership between NolaVie Magazine and Tulane classes seeking experience with public writing and scholarship. She also helped lead other public scholarship platforms, including MediaNOLA (2008-2016), focused on the mediated histories of New Orleans, and New Orleans Historical. She edited the international journal Television & New Media and she has both written and edited eight books about media production and production studies.

=== Study of the Times Picayune ===
In the Fall of 2013, Vicki Mayer and her team of Media Analysis students conducted research on The New Orleans Times-Picayune's quantity and quality of news coverage after its decision to end daily print distribution in favor of a series of digital formats. The researcher’s goal was to assess how this switch affected the number of news stories, the number of credible sources, and the quality of news stories, in terms of hard and soft news (p. 1). To compare the two methods of news distribution, students compared one month of news coverage, three days a week, over four consecutive weeks in October 2011 and 2013 (p. 1). Students collected print editions of the paper from 2011 and 2013 and screenshots of the top news stories on the newspaper’s online homepage and mobile app (pp. 1-2). After weeks of data collection, Mayer and her students found that print and digital formats in 2013 had more stories compared to the 2011 printed editions; however, the quality and importance of news beats declined while crime, sports, and entertainment stories nearly doubled (p. 2). Increasingly short, brief-type stories concerning local events, weather updates, and concert reviews; students concluded that stories were put together more quickly in 2013, with less reporting work put into each one (pp. 2-3). Ultimately, the study concluded that the digital news product contained a less researched and more soft-focused approach to reporting (pp. 2-3).

=== Below The Line ===
In Vicki Mayer’s book, Below the Line: Producers and Production Studies in the New Television Economy (Duke University Press, 2011), Mayer explores the labor activities of media workers, highlighting the invisible efforts of television set assemblers in Brazil, soft-core video camera operators in New Orleans, reality TV casters, and local cable television citizen regulators. Defining workers as “above the line” professionals who manage themselves, and “below the line” skilled laborers under the control of managers (p. 4), the media industry fails to recognize and support the labor of manual workers who make the television industry possible.

Elaborating on her experience in Brazil, Mayer interviews underpaid and overworked television assembly line workers who are forced to work in hazardous conditions (pp. 33-41). This tedious and monotonous work limited creativity and made workers more prone to injury (pp. 43-47). Despite these limitations, workers found ways to put their creative minds to use on the assembly line, utilizing this as a tool to decrease incidents (pp. 63).

As Mayer proceeds, she discusses the 1970s casualization of television and infomercials, where actors and strippers were paid poorly to save on talent costs (pp. 67-71). Soft-core camera operators, especially, dealt with poor pay and an unstable income (pp. 74-74). The careers of these soft-core professionals relied heavily on heterosexualized masculinity and misogyny, operating from the male gaze and objectifying the female body, searching for a certain look to professionalize the career (pp. 84-91).

Analyzing the system of casting for television, especially reality T.V, Mayer explains that through the work of producers and sponsors, surveillance technologies and other techniques could begin to decipher what audiences were interested in watching (pp. 107). Casters frequently argued that additional demographics were needed in the process of creating a cast in order to appeal to its desired audience (pp. 119-121). Mayer describes the objectification of the majority female industry and its low-prestige tier of production careers (pp. 129-136).

Mayer delves into her experiences as a professor in San Antonio and Davis, California. She explains that women are overrepresented in certain unpaid, voluntary roles, supporting this by sharing her own experiences with misogyny as she became more outspoken about her opinions (p. 149). As more regulatory work has shifted into the hands of ordinary citizens, individuals of less fortunate economic positions with less time on their hands possess little control over deregulation, preserving the “hierarchies of race and class through board membership” (pp. 169-173).

Mayer ultimately uses these examples and her own experiences in the industry to demonstrate how integral cultural identity is to television's invisible labor force (p. 175). Mayer asserts that production studies must eventually expand beyond television producers, prompting these invisible workers to articulate a political voice and force capitalism to change—in other words, “repoliticize the ordinary” (pp. 180-186).

=== Almost Hollywood, Nearly New Orleans ===
In Almost Hollywood, Nearly New Orleans (University of California Press, 2017), Vicki Mayer examines the history behind the Hollywood South, detailing the cultural significance behind media and the “creative economy” in New Orleans, contrasted with the exploitation of film industries and concentration of wealth through the privatization of public land (pp. 17-42) in New Orleans. Recounting early arguments over the cultural politics of filming in Los Angeles versus in New Orleans, New Orleans presented significant cultural restraints and could not sustain an entire industrial sector, despite its array of locations, accommodating weather, and efforts, such as Nola Film, which attempted to advertise the picturesque city to the world (pp. 17-42).

Mayer follows post-Katrina redevelopment, narrating the rise of film projects, some of which led to forced exits of locals and an influx of high-income residents, and complicating daily transportation services. Citizens were forced to learn to navigate their own city through signs, avoiding spaces that were publicly owned but currently occupied by film crews. Films set in New Orleans commonly perpetuated harmful stereotypes and failed to represent its vibrant culture (pp. 43-68).

Treme (2010-2013), a TV series filmed in New Orleans, hoped to authentically depict the city’s culture without leaning on the trauma of Hurricane Katrina. Locals described the show as a part of their grieving process and healing. However, viewers described it as “uncanny” and a reminder of a city they can no longer experience after gentrification (pp. 69-96).

The book ultimately examines tax cut incentives and job creation within the film industry, arguing that these benefits should be extended to all workers while promoting reinvestment and reforms to public-private partnerships (pp. 97-110).

=== Media Industries in Crisis ===
In Media Industries in Crisis: What COVID-19 Unmasked (London: Routledge, 2024), the contributors examine how COVID-19 impacted the media industry, recounting the escapism and solace it brought, while also emphasizing previous labor struggles and deeper crises it was already dealing with through a range of international case studies. Media workers were deemed “essential” during the worldwide pandemic, risking the safety and health of employees who had no choice but to remain as a result of short-term contracts and the industry’s required maintenance of one’s reputation to secure future employment. As viewers demanded more content, online media consumption and advertising sales increased, exacerbating the industry’s pre-existing sexual and racial violence and unequal concentration of power in certain locations.

Consequently, media industries became their own crisis managers, protecting their reputations and legitimacy as they failed to provide valid reasons why their employees should risk themselves to entertain viewers. The pandemic ultimately highlighted where the industry needed to make changes and how to manage complete uncertainty.

=== Single-authored books ===
- Mayer, Vicki. Producing Dreams, Consuming Youth: Mexican Americans and Mass Media. New Brunswick, NJ: Rutgers University Press, 2003.
- Mayer, Vicki. Below the Line: Television Producers and Production Studies in the New Economy. Durham, NC: Duke University Press, 2011.
- Mayer, Vicki. Almost Hollywood, Nearly New Orleans: A Film Economy Romance. Berkeley: University of California Press, 2017.

=== Edited or co-authored books ===
- Mayer, Vicki, Miranda Banks and John Caldwell, eds. Production Studies: Cultural Studies of Media Industries. New York: Routledge, 2009.
- Mayer, Vicki, ed. The International Encyclopedia of Media Studies: Media Production. Malden, MA: Wiley-Blackwell, 2013.
- Alexander, S.L., et al. The Times-Picayune in a Changing Media World: The Transformation of an American Newspaper. New York: Lexington, 2014.
- Banks, Miranda, Bridget Conor and Vicki Mayer, eds. Production Studies, The Sequel! Cultural Studies of Media Industries. New York: Routledge, 2015.
- Mayer, Vicki, Noa Lavie and Miranda Banks, eds. Media Industries in Crisis: What COVID Unmasked. London: Routledge, 2024.

=== Other editorial work ===
- Mayer, Vicki and Sonia Virginia Moreira, “Brazilian-U.S. Communication Forum.” International Journal of Communication 3 (2009): 667–714. [Edited journal issue]

=== External links ===
- Vicki Mayer on Google Scholar
- Vicki Mayer at Academia.edu
