= Center for Intercultural Dialogue =

Communication organization

The Center for Intercultural Dialogue (CID) was established by the Council of Communication Associations (CCA) in March 2010. Intercultural dialogue occurs when members of different cultural groups, who hold conflicting opinions and assumptions, speak to one another in acknowledgment of those differences. As such, it forms "the heart of what we study when we study intercultural communication." The goal of CID is double: to encourage research on intercultural dialogue, but to do so through bringing international scholars interested in the subject together in shared intercultural dialogues about their work.

CID is creating an international network, including both scholars and practitioners. CID broadly represents scholars in the discipline of Communication, but has a specific mandate to directly serve those who are members of any member associations of CCA. Since 2016, these have included:

- American Journalism Historians Association
- Association for Education in Journalism and Mass Communication
- Association of Schools of Journalism and Mass Communication
- Black College Communication Association
- Broadcast Education Association
- International Communication Association
- National Association for Media Literacy Education

When CID was founded in 2010, one other association was a member:

- National Communication Association

== History ==
CID was created as a direct result of the National Communication Association's Summer Conference on Intercultural Dialogue, held in Istanbul, Turkey, July 22–26, 2009. The timing was related to the European Year of Intercultural Dialogue in 2008. Wendy Leeds-Hurwitz, in her role as Chair of the International and Intercultural Communication Division of NCA, served as conference organizer, and Nazan Haydari, based at Maltepe University in Istanbul, served as coordinator. Other members of the organizing committee were Donal Carbaugh (US), Tamar Katriel (Israel), Kristine Fitch Muñoz (US), Yves Winkin (France), and Saskia Witteborn (Hong Kong). Support for the conference was provided by both NCA and Maltepe University. Patrice Buzzanell (2011) describes one of the plenary presentations in some detail, and Leeds-Hurwitz (2015) provides a detailed description of the unusual conference design. The Summer Conference resulted in a preconference at the International Communication Association convention in Singapore in 2010, organized by Evelyn Ho. The 2009 Conference led to a 2011 special issue of the Journal of International and Intercultural Communication, and a book in 2015. Broome & Collier (2012) praise the increased attention paid by intercultural scholars to intercultural dialogue as a specific focus, using CID as evidence for this attention.

Participants at the Summer Conference wanted further international connections for intercultural research. So in 2010 the Council of Communication Associations created the Center for Intercultural Dialogue. Wendy Leeds-Hurwitz was appointed Director of CID. The first Advisory Board included: Donal Carbaugh, William Evans, Nazan Haydari, Barbara Hines, Janice Hume, Leena Louhiala-Salminen, Charles Self, Michael Slater, Katerina Sténou and Valerie White. New members of the Board continue to be appointed every few years. The CID website now serves as a clearinghouse for information on intercultural dialogue topics. It facilitates connections between international scholars and practitioners by sharing information on: publication opportunities, international conference, positions, graduate school programs, and researcher profiles.

In March 2014, CID co-sponsored a conference with the University of Macau, entitled "Roundtable on Intercultural Dialogue in Asia." A videotape briefly summarizing that event is available online.

Dialogue generally, and intercultural dialogue specifically, have been discussed at multiple conferences, and served as the topic of consideration by many organizations over the past few years. Today it has become a key term and a "preferred form for human action," and Carbaugh specifically lists this CID as one such effort. Several other organizations have either the same or a similar name. The CID described in this entry is the only one designed to serve the Communication discipline specifically, and to facilitate the study of intercultural dialogue as a research topic by creating an international network of scholars. It is for this reason that CID's slogan is "Bridging Cultures Through Research."

== Publications ==
CID began publishing Key Concepts in Intercultural Dialogue, a set of one page descriptions of technical vocabulary related to intercultural dialogue in various ways, in February 2014. The first few terms were: intercultural dialogue, cosmopolitanism, intercultural competence, coordinated management of meaning, intercultural communication, intercultural capital, and intergroup relations dialogue, with 117 published by 2025. As of June 2016, concepts were added in translation into 32 plus languages from Tagalog to Persian.

Key Concepts has been used as a model several times by other publications, as for example, LSLP (Literacies in Second Languages Project) Micro-Papers edited by Raúl Alberto Mora at the Universidad Pontificia Bolivariana in Medellín, Colombia.

In 2017 other series were published, including, case studies, exercises, posters and occasional papers.

== Logo ==
Since CID grew out of the NCA Summer Conference on Intercultural Dialogue, all concerned parties agreed to continued use of the logo designed for that event by Özer Karakuş of Maltepe University. The multiple colors bound together represent cultural diversity and the need for intercultural dialogue. The bridge represents the Bosphorus Bridge in Istanbul, connecting Europe to Asia.

== Social media ==
A social media presence was established by 2014, and by 2016 there were thousands of followers on one platform or another. This includes a YouTube channel, a Facebook group, a LinkedIn page as well as Twitter, but Twitter was dropped in 2023.

== Video Competition ==
In 2018, the first CID Video Competition was established, asking students to prepare short videotapes answering the question "What does intercultural dialogue look like?" Jinsuk Kim of Temple University won first prize. In 2019, the second video competition asked "How do social media influence intercultural dialogue?" Juanma Marín Cubero and Rafa Muñoz Hernandez of the University of Murcia in Spain won first prize. The third competition asked for entries on how "Listening is where intercultural dialogue starts"; Israel Arcos, a student from Ecuador studying in the USA, won first prize. The top winners' videos each year are added to the CID YouTube site.

== See also ==
- Council of Communication Associations
- European Year of Intercultural Dialogue
- Intercultural dialogue
