= Susan Herring =

American linguist

- Education: State University of New York at Potsdam (B.A.); University of California, Berkeley (M.A., Ph.D.)
- Occupations: Linguist; scholar; professor

Susan Catherine Herring (born 1955) is an American linguist and communication scholar who researches gender differences in Internet use, and the characteristics, functions, and emergent norms associated with language, communication, and behavior in new online forms such as social media. She is Professor of Information Science and Linguistics at Indiana University Bloomington, where she founded and directs the Center for Computer-Mediated Communication. In 2013 she received the Association for Information Science & Technology Research Award for her contributions to the field of computer-mediated communication. She has been a fellow at the Center for Advanced Study in the Behavioral Sciences at Stanford University. Herring also founded and directed the BROG project.

== Education ==
Susan Herring has a Bachelor of Arts in French from the State University of New York at Potsdam, a Master of Arts in Linguistics from the University of California, Berkeley, and a Ph.D. in Linguistics from the University of California, Berkeley, in 1991, with a dissertation entitled, "Functions of the verb in Tamil narration". As part of her education, she studied several European languages at the Faculté des Lettres and the Institut de Touraine in Tours, France, and conducted doctoral-dissertation research in Madurai, India, as a Fulbright–Hays scholar.

== Academic appointments ==
After serving as a graduate student Instructor in the French Department and the Linguistics Department at U.C. Berkeley in the 1980s, Susan Herring was appointed as an Instructor in the Special Languages Program at Stanford University to teach Tamil, the South Dravidian language she researched for her doctoral dissertation, in the spring of 1989. Following her appointment as an assistant professor in the English Department at California State University, San Bernardino, in 1989, Herring was promoted to associate professor in 1992. She then moved to the University of Texas at Arlington, where she was an associate professor in the Linguistics Program from 1992 to 2000. She has worked at Indiana University since 2000 in the Department of Information and Library Science (formerly the School of Library and Information Science), where she was promoted to professor in 2002. She also holds an adjunct professor appointment in the Indiana University Linguistics Department. She is a fellow in the Center for Research on Learning Technologies, a fellow in the Rob Kling Center for Social Informatics, and she directs the Center for Computer-Mediated Communication, which she founded in 2014, at Indiana University. In 2012–2013, she was a fellow at the Center for Advanced Study in the Behavioral Sciences at Stanford University.

== Editorial appointments ==
The International Communication Association elected Herring Editor-in-Chief of the Journal of Computer-Mediated Communication in November 2004; she served in that capacity until December 2007. In January 2008, she was appointed Editor-in-Chief of Language@Internet. She serves on 11 editorial and advisory boards, including Discourse & Communication; Discourse, Context & Media; the Journal of Computer-Mediated Communication; Linguistik Online; PeerJ Computer Science; Pragmatics & Beyond New Series; Pragmatics and Society; The Information Society; the LINGUIST List; and Writing Systems Research.

== Key publications ==
- Susan C. Herring and Jannis Androutsopoulos. 2015. “Computer-mediated discourse 2.0,” In The handbook of discourse, 2nd ed. Deborah Tannen, Heidi E. Hamilton, Deborah Schiffrin, eds. John Wiley & Sons.
- Courtenay Honeycutt and Susan C. Herring. 2009. “Beyond Microblogging: Conversation and Collaboration via Twitter," Proceedings of the 42nd Hawaii International Conference on System Sciences.
- Susan C. Herring, Lois Ann Scheidt, Sabrina Bonus, Elijah Wright. 2004. "Bridging the Gap: A Genre Analysis of Weblogs."Proceedings of the 37th Hawaii International Conference on System Sciences.
- Susan C. Herring. 1996. Computer-mediated communication: Linguistic, social, and cross-cultural perspectives. John Benjamins Publishing.
