= Council of Communication Associations =

- Established: 1995
- Location: Washington, DC, USA
- Website: https://communicationassociations.wordpress.com/

The Council of Communication Associations is a non-profit organization established in 1995 as an umbrella entity for several learned societies in the field of communication studies. Its member societies include:

- American Journalism Historians Association
- Association for Education in Journalism and Mass Communication
- Association of Schools of Journalism and Mass Media
- Black College Communication Association
- Broadcast Education Association
- International Communication Association
- National Association for Media Literacy Education

Prior member association included:

- National Communication Association

CCA's Constitution states: "The purposes of the Council shall be to enhance the missions and to facilitate the activities of its member associations, to advocate for the welfare and promote the understanding and advancement of communication, domestically and internationally, as academic and professional fields."

Patrice Buzzanell et al. describe CCA as "an example of an umbrella association that serves regional, specifically North American, interests but that may serve much broader constituencies"

In 2010, CCA established the Center for Intercultural Dialogue. "The Center approaches ICD at two levels: encouraging research on the topic, but also bringing international scholars together in shared dialogue about their work"
