= Margaret D'Silva =

Academia

Margaret D'Silva is a professor in the Department of Communication at the University of Louisville. She is currently the professor of intercultural communication and mass media processes and effects. Her research is focused on the areas of public communication campaigns, children and television, and global mass media. D'Silva received her PhD in Communication from the University of Kentucky after receiving her M.A. in Literature from University of Mysore in India. D'Silva held the position of editor for the journal Intercultural Communication Studies. She served on the Board of Directors for International Association for Intercultural Communication Studies. She has also maintained the positions of Chair of the APAC Division of the National Communication Association and Chair of SSCA's Intercultural and Popular Communication Divisions. She is also director of the Institute for Intercultural Communication.

She has received numerous awards including the Presidential Award for Multicultural Teaching from the University of Kentucky and the awards of Excellence in the Art of Teaching and Excellence in Research from the Kentucky Communication Association.

== Research ==
Margaret D'Silva's work focuses on the research areas of the intersection of media, intercultural communication, and health.

== Publications ==
=== Books ===
D'Silva has co-authored the following 3 books:

- Atay, A., & D'Silva, M. (2019). Mediated intercultural communication in a digital age (1st ed.) Routledge.
- D'Silva, M., & Atay, A. (2019). Intercultural communication, identity, and social movements in the digital age Routledge.
- D'Silva, M., Hart, J. L., & Walker, K. L. (2009). HIV / AIDS: Prevention and health communication Cambridge Scholars Publishing.

=== Journals ===
D'Silva has written over 40 scholarly articles, that includes the following articles:

- D'Silva, M., Harrington, N. G., Palmgreen, P., Donohew, L., & Lorch, E. P. (2009). Drug use prevention for the high sensation seeker: The role of alternative activities. Substance use and Misuse, 36(3), 373–385.
- D'Silva, M., Leichty, G., & Agarwall, V. (2011). Cultural representations of HIV/AIDS in Indian print media . Intercultural Communication Studies, 2
- D'Silva, M., & Palmgreen, P. (2007). Individual differences and context: Factors mediating recall of anti-drug public service announcements. Health Communication, 21(1), 65–71.
- D'Silva, M., Smith, S., Della, L., Potter, D., Rajack-Talley, T., & Best, L. (2016). Reflexivity and positionality in researching African-American communities: Lessons from the field. Intercultural Communication Studies, 5(1)
