= Center for Mobile Communication Studies =

The Center for Mobile Communication Studies (CMCS) is a research center at Boston University College of Communication. Its current director is Dr. James E Katz, Feld Professor of Emerging Media.

The CMCS was established in June 2004 at the School of Communication and Information (Rutgers University). it is the world's first academic unit to focus solely on social aspects of mobile communication, and that it has become an international focal point for research, teaching and service on the social, psychological and organizational consequences of the burgeoning mobile communication revolution.

The center's staff investigates how mobile communication is affecting human behavior as well as mobile technology's long-term organizational and policy implications. The center's staff includes: James E Katz, Ph.D., Director, Jacob Groshek, Ph.D., James Shanahan, Ph.D., Mina Tsay-Vogel, Ph.D., Tammy R. Vigil, Ph.D. T. Barton Carter, JD., Christopher B. Daly, and Dustin Supa.

The Center helps to develop courses that enhance Boston University College of Communication's core focus on mediated communication in undergraduate and graduate coursework and outreach. The center also provides critical commentary and advice for public and non-profit groups and assists private sector organizations through research, information dissemination, and expert consultation.

The center's official launch at Boston University took place on April 9, 2014.
