= Apparatgeist =

Technology-related theory

The Apparatgeist theory is a concept in the sociology of technology that explores how people across cultures tend to use personal communication technologies (PCTs) — such as mobile phones — in similar ways, regardless of cultural differences. It was developed by James E. Katz and Mark Aakhus. Katz describes it as "the spirit of the machine that influences both the designs of the technology as well as the initial and subsequent significance accorded to them by users, non-users and anti-users."

The theory examines the social, cultural, and material dimensions of mobile and PCTs. Katz and Aakhus introduced the term to emphasize how human use of technology shapes both its development and its meaning. They identified cross-cultural patterns in the adoption and use of mobile phones, including shifts in communication habits, increased participation in online social networks, and the emergence of unexpected or improvised behaviors in mobile communication.

== Background ==
This theory examines one's relationship with their technology, as well as the relationship that the two have with society. The term refers to “the common set of strategies or principles of reasoning about technology evident in the identifiable, consistent and generalized patterns of technological advancement throughout history.” According to Katz, “regardless of culture, when people interact with PCTs, they tend to standardise infrastructure and gravitate towards consistent tastes and universal features.”

Apparatgeist is a neologism in the field of new media and communication and it is in some ways “lead to New Age kinds of spiritualism represented in attempts to suggest a new kind of community technospirit which emerges within a particular medium." Katz and Aakhus argue that individuals tend to "standardize infrastructure and gravitate towards consistent tastes and universal features." Users thus engage in mobile telephone use in largely similar ways. The essence of the Apparatgeist theory is that technology use is socially constructed and not technologically deterministic. These norms are established as a shared understanding of how one's technology should be used. This shared understanding is derived from the social construction theory and is commonly referred to as "social constructionism."

== Theoretical elements ==
Pertaining to how PCTs bring about the Apparatgeist:

- PCTs have a Geist which can be likened to the expansion of freedom.
- PCTs have their own logic that informs the judgements people make about the utility or value of the technologies in their environment.”
- PCTs inform the predictions that scientists and technology producers might make about personal technologies.
- “PCTs have a socio-logic that results from ‘communities of people “thinking and acting together over time.”’
- In making possible Apparatgeist PCTs, ‘the compelling image of perpetual contact is the image of pure communication ... which is an idealization of communication committed to the prospect of sharing one’s mind with another, like the talk of angels that occurs without the constraints of the body.'

== Application of Apparatgeist theory in other research ==
Yuan focuses on the effects of Chinese culture on mobile communication usage behavior and patterns. Through a snowball sampling technique, the research gathered in-depth interviews with Chinese people living in metropolitan areas. The results showed that there was a clear distinction in the way Chinese people communicated on mobile phones versus people in the West. Contrary to western cultures’ emphasis on keeping a small and tight knit circle of contacts in their mobile phones, the findings in this research showed that Chinese mobile users have a large and open network of mobile contact. “Contextualized mobility” was found to be more significant than the theoretical constructions of the Apparatgeist and perpetual contact.

Kneidinger-Müller extends the Apparatgeist theory to understand the social factors that understand the effects of parallel communication habits in the usage of mobile phones. The research surveyed 339 smartphone users in Germany and found that social factors were equally as important as usage and technological factors to understand communication practices.

Tojib et al. applies both the Apparatgeist and domestication theory as a theoretical groundwork to show how the symbolic use of smartphones brings about positive effect on user attachment to mobile phones. Subsequently, this leads to the experimental value of using value-added mobile services that is defined as “any services beyond voice calls and short messaging services offered by mobile telecommunication service providers.” Apparatgeist helps to support the idea that the add-on activities via value-added mobile services bring “purposeful engagement” and ultimately brings experiential value and value-expressiveness to users.

Axelsson examines culture and life stages as factors to see which is more a primary determiner of mobile-phone usage and attitudinal patterns. Deriving data from a Swedish national survey of 18–24 year olds in Sweden, Axelsson find that “young adults (compared with older people) seem to be in perpetual contact with family, friends and colleagues.” This finding shows that life stages are a greater determinant factor than culture in the use of and attitudes towards mobile phones. The Apparatgeist theory supports the hypothesis in this research; “the mobile phone is used in rather similar ways, regardless of cultural context.”

Vanden Abeele explores the variations in lifestyles within mobile youth culture by constructing a user typology of Flemish adolescents and measuring the gratifications received from the use of mobile phones. Apparatgeist is used as a theoretical basis to emphasize shared commonalities in developmental challenges that adolescents face, particularly when it came to the similarities in mobile phone gratifications regardless different cultural contexts. The research concludes that a complex relationship is visible among the “structural and social-psychological backgrounds of youths, developmental tasks, and the functionalities of mobile media technologies as they are recognized in a particular time and context.”

Tan et al. conducted a multi-method study to understand whether email and SMS—two types of PCTs—were more or less suitable for different environments. Consistent with the apparatgeist and social construction theory, this research shows that PCTs carry a common set of meanings about their nature and purpose that are general across social settings. Consumers overwhelmingly “perceived SMS as more intimate and also more intrusive than email”. Nonetheless, the study also validates the context-cultural dimension differences such as different preferences for use in dissemination of commercial messages between Chinese and Swiss consumers.

Campbell drew on the apparatgeist theory to explore the extent to which the use of mobile telephones by individuals in different cultures show similarities or variations. By sampling college students from Hawaii, Japan, Sweden, Taiwan and the US, Campbell concluded that although there are apparent varieties in communication practices in different cultures, there is also an inherent universality in the way people interact through mobile phones that stem from a basic human need. This idea of communication as a universal aspect of humanity comes from the basis of Apparatgeist.

Shuter et al. explores the impact of cultural values and observes the contextual norms on mobile phone activity between American and Danes. Apparatgeist and SCOT (the social construction of technology) theory are used as an initial starting point for this research. Extending beyond the contextual and inmate human values factor found in the Apparatgeist and SCOT theory, the findings of this research identifies a universal logic and indigenous cultural factors as a foundation to the study of cross-national attitudes and usage of mobile phones.

== Contesting views ==
Mizuko Ito, an anthropologist at the University of California, Irvine, believes technologies are both constructive and constructed by historical, social, and cultural contexts. Rather than conducting a comparative and global survey of mobile phone use, Ito looked at the multifaceted and sustained engagement of mobile phone use in one national context – Japan. Through this approach, Ito finds significance in the social and cultural diversity in mobile phone use across different cultures.

Scott Campbell of the University of Michigan, author of several papers on mobile-phone usage, expects some persistence of cultural variations. Campbell's study “suggest that cultural values may influence the norms of mobile communicators, with individualists and collectivists." Campbell believes that people behave differently in public settings that stem from different cultural and social norms. He extends this idea by establishing terms such as horizontal and vertical individualists to display different mobile phone norms.
