= Julia Ebner =

Austrian writer

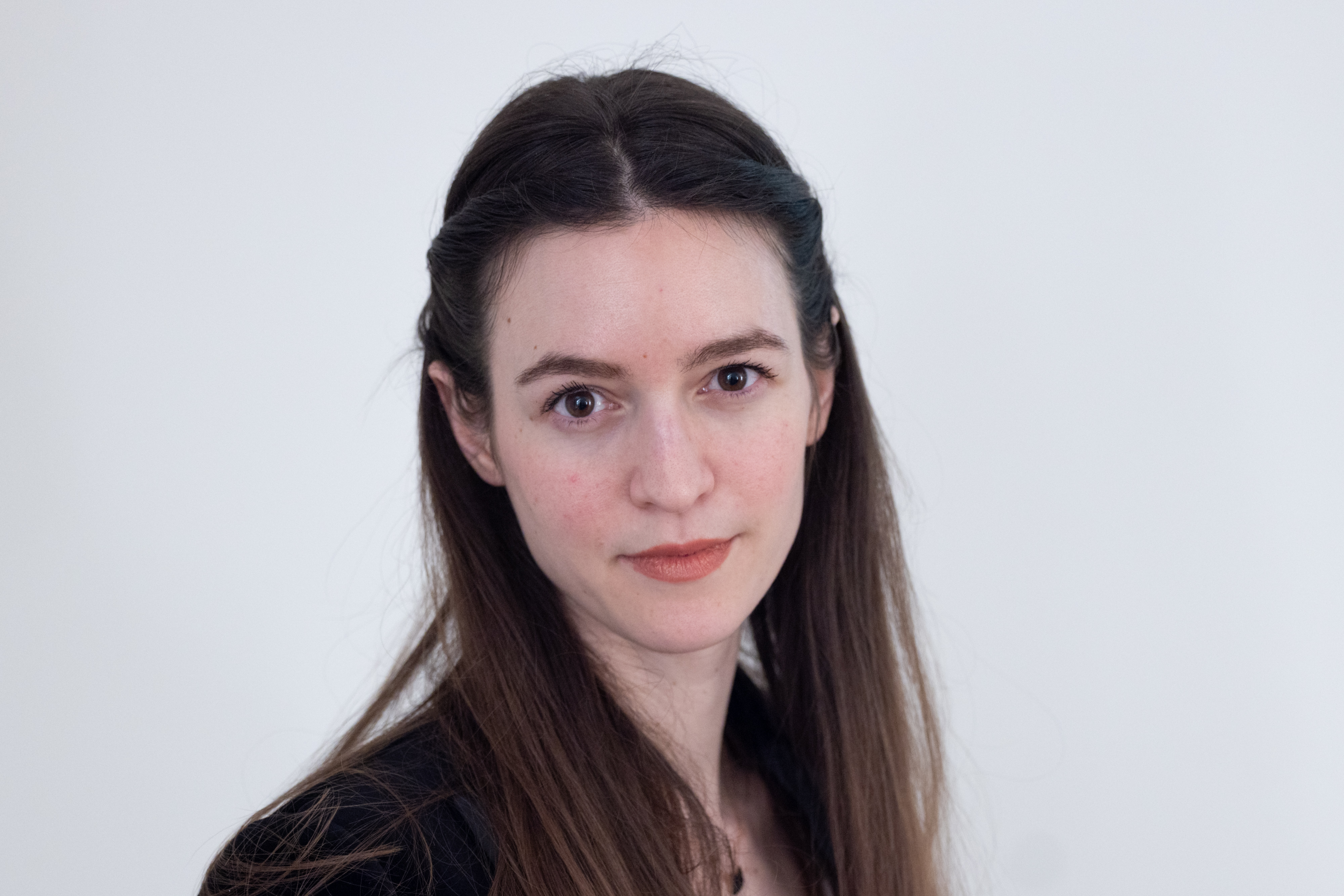
- Ebner in 2023
- Born: Vienna
- Occupations: Political advisor, scientist, journalist, author
- Employers: Institute for Strategic Dialogue (2017–); United Nations (2020–2021)
- Awards: (2024)
- Website: www.julia-ebner.com

Julia Ebner (born 1991) is an Austrian-British researcher and author based in London and Oxford. She has written the books The Rage: the Vicious Circle of Islamist and Far-Right Extremism, Going Dark: the Secret Social Lives of Extremists and Going Mainstream: How Extremists Are Taking Over, and The Language of Terrorists: Distinguishing Trolls From Violent Extremists.

== Career ==
Ebner holds a DPhil from the University of Oxford, where she is currently a postdoctoral research fellow at the Calleva Centre for Evolution and Human Science at Magdalen Collegeand a Research Affiliate at the Centre for Democratic Resilience at Oxford's Department of Politics and International Relations. She is also a guest lecturer at the University of Zurich.

Ebner has a BA in philosophy and a BSc in international business. She holds an MSc in international history from the London School of Economics and an MSc in international relations from Peking University.

Between 2015 and 2017, she worked as a senior researcher at the counter-extremism organisation Quilliam. In 2017, she joined the think tank Institute for Strategic Dialogue as a research fellow, where she currently serves as Co-Executive Director. She has written for The Guardian and The Independent.

Going Dark: the Secret Social Lives of Extremists documents Ebner's experiences over two years spent undercover, infiltrating far-right networks such as Generation Identity and Reconquista Germanica, both on-line and in person.

Her book Going Mainstream: how extremists are taking over was published in 2023. It is based on investigative reporting and interviews and asks why extremist ideas and concepts increasingly enter mainstream politics and societal discourse.

In 2024, Ebner was named Austrian of the Year by the Austrian Foreign Ministry.

== Publications ==
=== Books by Ebner ===
- The Rage: the Vicious Circle of Islamist and Far-Right Extremism. London: I.B. Tauris, 2017. ISBN 978-1788310321.
- Radikalisierungsmaschinen: Wie Extremisten die neuen Technologien nutzen und uns manipulieren (radicalization machines: how extremists use new technology and manipulate us). Berlin: Suhrkamp Nova, 2019. ISBN 978-3-518-47007-7.
- Going Dark: the Secret Social Lives of Extremists. London: Bloomsbury, 2020. ISBN 9781526616784.
- Going Mainstream: how extremists are taking over. London: Bonnier Group, 2023. ISBN 1804183156.
- The Language of Terrorists. Distinguishing Trolls from Violent Extremists. Columbia University Press, New York City 2026, ISBN 978-0-231-21441-4.
- Von Fitness zu Faschismus. Gefahren extremer Männlichkeit | Wie neue Männlichkeitskulte zu politischem Extremismus führen können. Suhrkamp, Berlin 2026, ISBN 978-3-518-43325-6.
