= James R. Taylor =

Canadian sociologist (1928–2022)

James Renwick Taylor (December 13, 1928 – April 21, 2022) was a Canadian academic and Professor Emeritus at the Department of Communication of the Université de Montréal, which he founded with Annie Méar and André H. Caron Ed.D in the early 1970s.

== Biography ==
Born on December 13, 1928, Taylor received his BA and MA from Mount Allison University in Sackville, New Brunswick in 1949 and 1950. The next year in England, he received his ABD in Literature from the University of London. Later in 1978 he received his PhD in Communication from the University of Pennsylvania.

Back in Canada, Taylor started his career as radio and television producer for the Canadian Broadcasting Corporation in Ottawa in 1956, where in 1963 he became Regional Supervisor. In 1966 he started at the University of Pennsylvania as lecturer and as Director of the TV Laboratory. In 1970 he moved to the Université de Montréal, where he was appointed Professor at the newly founded Department of Communication. In 1999 he retired and was named Emeritus Professor. In the 1980s he was also adviser on Planning at the Department of Communications Canada in Ottawa, and board member of the Canadian Workplace Automation Research Centre (CWARC), later Centre for Information Technology Innovation (CITI).

James R. Taylor died on April 21, 2022, at the age of 93.

== Work ==
Drawing from research in fields such as organizational psychology (Karl E. Weick), ethnomethodology (Harold Garfinkel, Deirdre Boden), phenomenology (Alfred Schütz) and collective minding (Edwin Hutchins), Taylor developed an original theory of organizational communication, suggesting that communication is the "site and surface" of organizations, rather than a phenomenon taking place within pre-existing organizations. He uses interaction and conversation analysis to understand the processes by which organizations and organizational roles emerge and are maintained.

The line of thought initiated by James Taylor has come to be known as "The Montreal School" of organizational communication, sometimes referred to as TMS, and has been acknowledged as an original theory by such authors as Haridimos Tsoukas, Linda Putnam, Karl E. Weick, Barbara Czarniawska.

== See also ==
- Text and Conversation Theory

== Selected bibliography ==
- Cooren, F., J. R. Taylor, & E. J. Van Every (Eds.) (2006). Communication as organizing: Empirical and Theoretical Explorations In the dynamic of text and conversation. Mahwah, NJ: Lawrence Erlbaum Associates.
- Taylor, J. R. & E. J. Van Every (2000). The Emergent Organization: Communication as its Site and Surface. Mahwah, NJ: Lawrence Erlbaum Associates.
- Taylor, J. R. (1993). Rethinking the theory of organizational communication : how to read an organization. Norwood, NJ: Ablex Publishing.
- Taylor, J. R. & E. J. Van Every (1993). The Vulnerable Fortress: Bureaucratic Organization and Management in the Information Age. Toronto: University of Toronto Press.
- Taylor, J. R.; C. Groleau; L. Heaton & E. J. Van Every (2001). The Computerization of Work: A Communication Perspective. Thousand Oaks, CA: Sage.
