= Human Communication Research =

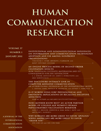
- Discipline: Communication
- Language: English
- Edited by: Yariv Tsfati and Steven R. Wilson

Publication details
- History: 1974–present
- Publisher: Oxford University Press on behalf of the International Communication Association
- Frequency: Quarterly
- Impact factor: 5.333 (2021)

Standard abbreviations
- ISO 4: Hum. Commun. Res.

Indexing
- ISSN: 0360-3989 (print); 1468-2958 (web)
- LCCN: 78641058
- OCLC no.: 936518622

Links
- Journal homepage; Online archive

Human Communication Research is a quarterly peer-reviewed academic journal covering empirical work in any area of human communication and human symbolic processes. It was established in 1974 and the current editor-in-chief is Yariv Tsfati (University of Hafai) and Steven R. Wilson (University of South Florida). It is published by Oxford University Press on behalf of the International Communication Association. According to the Journal Citation Reports, the journal has a 2022 impact factor of 5.0 ranking it 13th out of 96 journals in the category "Communication".

== Editors ==
The following persons have been previous editors-in-chief:

- 2017-2020: Eun-Ju Lee (Seoul National University)
- 2013−2017: John Courtright (University of Delaware)
- 2010−2012: James E. Katz (Rutgers University)
- 2007−2009: Jake Harwood (University of Arizona)
- 2004−2006: James Price Dillard (Pennsylvania State University)
- 2001−2003: John O. Greene (Purdue University)
- 1998−2000: Edward L. Fink (University of Maryland, College Park)
- 1995−1997: Cindy Gallois (University of Queensland)
- 1992−1994: Howard Giles (University of California, Santa Barbara)
- 1989−1991: James Bradac (University of California, Santa Barbara)
- 1987−1988: Joseph N. Cappella (University of Pennsylvania)
- 1984−1986: Charles R. Berger (University of California, Davis)
- 1980−1983: Mark L. Knapp (University of Texas at Austin)
- 1977−1979: James C. McCroskey (University of Alabama at Birmingham)
- 1974−1976: Gerald R. Miller (Michigan State University)
