= Communication, Culture & Critique =

Peer-reviewed academic journal

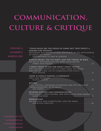
- Discipline: Communication, media, and cultural studies
- Language: English
- Edited by: Melissa Click

Publication details
- History: 2008–present
- Publisher: Oxford University Press on behalf of the International Communication Association
- Frequency: Quarterly

Standard abbreviations
- ISO 4: Commun. Cult. Crit.

Indexing
- ISSN: 1753-9129 (print); 1753-9137 (web)
- LCCN: 2007245365
- OCLC no.: 171290511

Links
- Journal homepage; Online access; Online archive

Communication, Culture & Critique is a quarterly peer-reviewed academic journal covering research on the role of communication and cultural criticism, spanning the fields of communication, media, and cultural studies. It was established in 2008 with Karen Ross (University of Liverpool) as the founding editor-in-chief. Since 2014, the editor-in-chief has been Radhika Parameswaran (Indiana University Bloomington). It is published by Oxford University Press on behalf of the International Communication Association.

== Abstracting and indexing ==
The journal is abstracted and indexed in Communication & Mass Media Index and the MLA International Bibliography.
