= Journal of Computer-Mediated Communication =

Communication journal

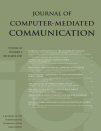
- Discipline: Computer-mediated communication
- Language: English
- Edited by: Co-Editors: Teresa Correa, Nicole Ellison, Cuihua (Cindy) Shen, and Mike Yao

Publication details
- History: 1995–present
- Publisher: Oxford University Press on behalf of the International Communication Association
- Frequency: Quarterly
- Impact factor: 4.896 (2018)

Standard abbreviations
- ISO 4: J. Comput.-Mediat. Commun.
- NLM: J Comput Mediat Commun

Indexing
- ISSN: 1083-6101

Links
- Journal homepage

The Journal of Computer-Mediated Communication JCMC is a quarterly open access peer-reviewed academic journal that covers the interdisciplinary field of computer-mediated communication. It was established in 1994 and is published by Oxford University Press on behalf of the International Communication Association.

According to the Journal Citation Reports, its 2018 impact factor was 4.896, ranking 1st out of 88 in the category "Communication" and 2nd out of 89 in the category "Information Science & Library Science".

== Editors ==
The following persons have been editor-in-chief of the journal:

- 2022-Present: Co-Editors; Teresa Correa (Diego Portales University), Nicole Ellison (University of Michigan), Cuihua (Cindy) Shen (University of California, Davis), and Mike Yao (University of Illinois)
- 2018–2021: Richard Ling (Nanyang Technological University)
- 2014–2017: Shyam Sundar (Pennsylvania State University)
- 2011–2013: Maria Bakardjieva (University of Calgary)
- 2008–2010: Kevin Wright (University of Oklahoma)
- 2005–2007: Susan Herring (Indiana University)
- 1994–2004: Founding Editors: Margaret McLaughlin (University of Southern California) and Sheizaf Rafaeli (Hebrew University of Jerusalem and University of Haifa)
