= Patrice Buzzanell =

American academic

Patrice Buzzanell is a distinguished professor and former department chair for the Department of Communication at the University of South Florida and at the Brian Lamb School of Communication at Purdue University. Buzzanell focuses on organizational communication from a feminist viewpoint. A majority of the research Dr. Buzzanell has completed is geared towards how everyday interactions, identities, and social structures can be affected by the intersections of gender. She researches how these dynamics can impact overall practices, decisions, and results in the workplace, and more specifically, in the STEM fieldwork environments.

Buzzanell has written four books and 85 book chapters, published over 80 journal articles, as well as contributed to numerous conference papers. She is also a highly involved professor at Purdue University, where she is affiliated faculty with both Women's, Gender, and Sexuality Studies and the Center for Families, serves as a faculty team advisor and maintains a courtesy appointment with the School of Engineering Education. She also serves as the Butler Chair and Director of the Susan Bulkeley Butler Center for Leadership Excellence.

== Life and education ==
Buzzanell attended Towson University to earn her B.S., where she graduated summa cum laude. She attended Ohio University to earn her M.A., and then she also attended Purdue University to earn her Ph.D. in organizational communication. She worked as an associate professor for five years at Northern Illinois University. She taught in the Brian Lamb School of Communication at Purdue University from 1999 until 2017. Buzzanell left Purdue to teach at the University of South Florida.

== Scholarly work ==
Buzzanell began publishing in 1991, covering such topics as feminist organizational communication theory, reframing the glass ceiling as a socially constructed process, and researching leadership processes in alternative organizations. She then released her first edited book in 2000 titled Rethinking Organizational and Managerial Communication from Feminist Perspectives. She has since been a featured author of chapters in different books and has written several articles (67 refereed, 17 non-refereed).

== Other contributions ==
Buzzanell continues to stay active in her research agenda and contribute to the field in other ways. Dr. Buzzanell is on the International Academic Committee, which is an advisory board for the Global Communication Research Institute. She is a part of the National Communication Association on both the NCA Publications Board and the NCA Task Force on Inclusivity and she is a Council of Communication Associations ICA representative as well. She also currently serves as a board member for eight different journals. Previously, she has been involved as president of the International Communication Association, the Council of Communication Associations, and the Organization for the Study of Communication, Language and Gender.

== Awards ==
Buzzanell has received awards for papers, articles, and books. She has also been presented with awards for mentoring, teaching, research, and scholarship honors, and has been recognized for her engagement in different service organizations. Dr. Buzzanell has been awarded over 75 times throughout her career.

- University Distinguished Professor at Purdue University, 2015-present.
- B. Aubrey Fisher Mentorship Award, 2016.
- Top Panel Award, 2016. For Reframing, Rejecting, and Repurposing Work/Life Boundaries through Communication.
- Provost's Outstanding Graduate Mentor Award, 2014.
- Teresa Award, 2012. For the feminist viewpoint she incorporated into organizational communication.
- Helen B. Schleman Gold Medallion, 2010.
- Outstanding Scholarly Article, 2006. For her article Struggling with Maternity Leave Policies and Practices: A Poststructuralist Feminist Analysis of Gendered Organizing.
- Charles H. Woolbert Research Award, 2006
- Violet Haas Award, 2003
- Outstanding Young Women in America, 1982

Dr. Buzzanell also has a number of distinguished lectures and keynote addresses at different universities across both the country and the world.

== Bibliography ==
=== Books ===
- Cases in Organizational and Managerial Communication: Stretching Boundaries, (2017).
- Distinctive qualities in communication research, (2010).
- Gender in Applied Communication Contexts, (2004).
- Rethinking Organization and Managerial Communication from Feminist Perspectives, (2000).

=== Book chapters ===
- Public Understandings of Women in STEM: A Prototype Analysis of Governmental Discourse from the C-SPAN Archives, (2016).
- How Resilience is Constructed in Everyday Work-life Experience Across the Lifespan, (2015).
- Having—and doing—it all? The Hidden Nature of Informal Support Systems in Career and Personal Life Management, (2014).
- Revisiting Sexual Harassment in Academe: Using Feminist Ethical and Sensemaking Approaches to Analyze Macrodiscourses and Micropractices of Sexual Harassment, (2004).

=== Journal articles ===
- Cybervetting, Person–Environment Fit, and Personnel Selection: Employers' Surveillance and Sensemaking of Job Applicants' Online Information, (2014)
- Stories of Caregiving: Intersections of Academic Research and Women’s Everyday Experiences, (2009).
- Struggling with Maternity Leave Policies and Practices: A Poststructuralist Feminist Analysis of Gendered Organizing, (2005).
- Negotiating Maternity Leave Expectations: Perceived Tensions Between Ethics of Justice and Care, (2004).
- Blue-collar work, career, and success: occupational narratives of Sisu, (2004).
- An Organizational Communication Challenge to the Discourse of Work and Family Research: From Problematics to Empowerment, (2003).
- Emotion Work Revealed by Job Loss Discourse: Backgrounding-Foregrounding of Feelings, Construction of Normalcy, and (Re)instituting of Traditional Masculinities, (2003).
- Gendered Practices in the Contemporary Workplace: A Critique of What Often Constitutes Front Page New in the Wall Street Journal, (2001).

== See also ==
- Intersectionality
- Organizational communication
