= Communication Theory (journal) =

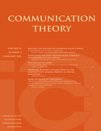
- Discipline: Communication theory
- Language: English
- Edited by: Jörg Matthes

Publication details
- History: 1991–present
- Publisher: Wiley on behalf of the International Communication Association (United States)
- Frequency: Quarterly
- Impact factor: 1.667 (2014)

Standard abbreviations
- ISO 4: Commun. Theory

Indexing
- ISSN: 1050-3293 (print); 1468-2885 (web)
- OCLC no.: 21463248

Links
- Journal homepage; Online access; Online archive

Communication Theory is a quarterly peer-reviewed academic journal publishing research articles, theoretical essays, and reviews on topics of broad theoretical interest from across the range of communication studies. It was established in 1991 and the current editor-in-chief is Jörg Matthes (University of Vienna). According to the Journal Citation Reports, the journal has a 2025 impact factor of 7.5, ranking it 3rd out of 227 journals in the category "Communication." It is published by Oxford University Press on behalf of the International Communication Association.

Communication theories are frameworks used by scholars and practitioners to understand and predict how information is conveyed, interpreted, and understood. They explore basic elements of communication, from interpersonal conversations to mass media messaging, and provide insights into message crafting, technology influence, and media priorities.

== Editors ==
The following persons have been editor-in-chief of the journal:

- 2023–present: Jörg Matthes (University of Vienna)
- 2019–2022: Maria Elizabeth (Betsi) Grabe (Indiana U)
- 2016–2019: Karin Wilkins (U of Texas-Austin)
- 2012–2015: Thomas Hanitzsch (LMU Munich)
- 2009–2011: Angharad N. Valdivia (University of Illinois at Urbana–Champaign)
- 2006–2008: Francois Cooren (Université de Montréal)
- 2003–2005: Chris Segrin (University of Arizona)
- 2003: Scott Jacobs (University of Illinois)
- 2000–2002: Michael J. Cody (University of Southern California)
- 1997–1999: James A. Anderson (University of Utah)
- 1994–1996: Don Ellis (University of Hartford)
- 1991–1993: Robert T. Craig (University of Colorado at Boulder)
