= Reconquista Germanica =

The Reconquista Germanica (RG) is an extreme-right channel running on the Discord application, which was set up to disrupt the German election of 2017. The group has over 5000 users. The goal of the group is to ‘ensure the strongest possible showing for the Alternative for Germany (AfD) in the Bundestag’. It is managed according to hierarchical structures using military language and alt-right vocabulary.

The Süddeutsche Zeitung cites 5000 users on the RG Discord channel. They have been instructed to create as many Twitter accounts as possible and to re-tweet as much as possible the material on the RG Discord channel. Thus the impression of RG representing a majority point of view may be created. The goal is not so much to convince their opponents, but to provoke, humiliate and insult them. Other strategies used in social media include representing oneself as a refugee or to pretend publicly that there is no longer a war in Syria. During one day in September 2017 seven of the hashtags defined by RG reached the top 20 trending hashtags in Germany.

The RG vets potential members carefully through several layers of interviews and social media background checks to weed out spies, however the organization was infiltrated by the NGO Institute for Strategic Dialogue (ISD). The RG and Internet trolls have, according to the ISD, dictated social media conversations and influenced top trending hashtags.

== Connections to other groups ==
According to Julia Ebner, who studied the group, there are links between RG and the AfD. Further, German broadcaster ARD has documented organizational links between AfD youth organization "Junge Alternative" and the RG.

The self-proclaimed "Commander-in-Chief" of RG, who uses the code name "Nikolai Alexander", has acknowledged close connections with Russia, and stated the group would not have been possible in its actual form without Russian assistance.
