= François Cooren =

François Cooren is a French and Canadian communication scholar and was, from 2005 to 2008, the editor of Communication Theory. He completed his Ph.D. at the Department of communication of the Université de Montréal in 1996, under the supervision of James R. Taylor. He was chairman of that same department from 2006 to 2015, where he is full professor. Cooren also completed a postdoc at the Université de Louvain-la-Neuve, in Belgium.

Cooren is former President of the International Communication Association (2010–2011), an ICA fellow since 2013 and an NCA distinguished scholar since 2017.

Cooren's research mainly focuses on organisational communication in mundane and emergency situations. He is part of what has come to be known in the field as the Montreal School of Organizational Communication, which proposes communication as the "site and surface" of organizations, meaning that the latter emerge from and are maintained by communication processes. This parts from what could be called conventional organizational communication, which views communication as a phenomenon taking place in pre-existing organizations. That particular point of view, inspired by the works of Taylor and Van Every, Weick and others, leads Cooren to use interaction analysis and conversation analysis as his main source of data, although, whereas other interaction or conversation analysts do not seek to explain anything beyond the observed interaction, Cooren, following the works of Harold Garfinkel or even Gabriel Tarde, uses the micro - the interactions - to find an explanation to what takes place at the macro - organizational - level.

== Selected bibliography ==
- Cooren, F. (2010). Action and agency in dialogue: Passion, incarnation and ventriloquism. Amsterdam: John Benjamins Publishing Company.
- Cooren, F. (Ed.) (2006). Interacting and Organizing: Analyses of a Board Meeting. Mahwah, NJ: Lawrence Erlbaum.
- Cooren, F., J. R. Taylor, & E. J. Van Every (Eds.) (2006). Communication as organizing: Empirical and Theoretical Explorations In the dynamic of text and conversation. Mahwah, NJ: Lawrence Erlbaum Associates.
- Cooren, F. (2000). The Organizing Property of Communication. Amsterdam/Philadelphia: John Benjamins
