= Akdim =

Turkish non-profit

The Antalya Intercultural Dialog Center
- Abbreviation: AKDİM
- Formation: 2006
- Type: Non-profit; NGO
- Headquarters: Elmalı Mahallesi, 19. Sokak, No:2 – Antalya, Turkey
- Secretary-General: Dr. H. İbrahim Kundak
- Website: http://www.akdim.org

AKDIM (The Antalya Intercultural Dialogue Center, original Turkish: Antalya Kültürlerarası Dialog Merkezi), founded in 2005, is a non-profit organization in Antalya, Turkey which focuses on promoting intercultural dialog within and across different cultural backgrounds. AKDİM describes its mission as bringing people from a wide range of cultural backgrounds together to encourage dialogue, and to improve cross cultural awareness. It organizes a number of activities in varying disciplines, from art to sport and trips to conferences. AKDİM receives operational funding from activity sponsors and member donations.

== Platforms ==
=== KABİP ===
The Intercultural Togetherness Platform (Kültürlerarası Birliktelik Platformu) is aimed primarily at bringing together Turkish citizens and foreigners in Antalya. Activities to encourage this include "Tuesday tea", hiking, cooking club, information seminars, a Turkish course for foreigners, and theme and special occasions (Mother's Day, Easter, Noah's Pudding, etc.).

=== BİYAP ===
The Platform for Living Together (Birlikte Yaşama Platformu) aims to bring people together through culture, science and the arts. Activities include conferences and seminars, concerts, exhibitions, Turkish Language Olympiads, etc.

=== GEP ===
The Self-Improvement Platform (Geliştirme Platformu) encourages personal and career growth through organized activities such as computer, language, and speaking courses.

=== RESOP ===
The Relax and Outdoor Platform (Relax ve Spor Platformunda) organizes different sport and leisure activities like hunting, riding, etc.

== Recognition ==
Some of its events include:

- Impact of civil society on the democratization process, 'Hizmet' movement conference
- Civil Constitution Conference
- Does The 'Underground' Government Get Liquidation? Conference
- Universal Parameters of The Law and Human Rights Conference
- Turkish Language Olympiads Provincial Events (2009–2010 – 2011–2012)
- Dialog Fast Break (2011–2012)

== Advisory committee ==
- Erdoğan Çiğdem – Pedagogue

Haşmet Öyken Gazeteci. tuncer çetinkaya ..

- Prof. Helen Rose Ebaugh – Academician
- Hasan Tarık Şen – Lawyer
- Prof. James C. Harrington – Academician
- Ahmet Sözgen – Antalya University Secretary-General
- Uğur Kepir – Pedagogue
  - Prof. Alexander Scott – Academician
- Prof. Martha Ann Kirk – Academician
- Dr. Murat Kaplan – Academician
