= Broadcast Education Association =

Academic organization devoted to multimedia research and teaching

The Broadcast Education Association (BEA) is an international academic organization originating and operating mainly out of the United States. The BEA is devoted to multimedia research and teaching, and retains the historical purpose to prepare college students interested in telecommunications and electronic mass media for careers in radio and television. According to its website, the BEA slogan is “Educating for Tomorrow’s Media.”

== Members ==
The BEA consist of associate, institutional, individual, and student members. Associate members include; radio and television stations, academic research organizations, telephone and cable companies, publishers, high schools, and PR organizations, media manufacturers, and law firms. Institutional members include colleges and universities with electronic media programs. Individual members consist of professors and educators interested in multimedia pursuits. Student members consist of undergraduate and graduate students interested in multimedia.

== Research ==
The BEA hosts an annual convention with a research conference containing eighteen interest divisions, ranging from cultural perspectives (history, gender and sexuality, and law and policy, religion, etc.) to media production, aesthetics, and curriculum. Additionally, the BEA produces two peer-reviewed print research journals, The Journal of Broadcasting and Electronic Media and Journal of Radio and Audio Media, as well as one editor-reviewed online journal on the topic of media pedagogy, Journal of Media Education. Both print research journals have acceptance rates below 20%, while the annual convention typically maintains acceptance rates of 40%-70%.

== History ==
=== UAPRE ===
A broadcasting association in the United States, BEA underwent several name changes in the developmental years of the association. Initially organized in 1948, the small University Association for Professional Radio Education (UAPRE) almost ceased to exist because of a lack of organization leading to a lack of specific activities and goals.

=== APBE ===
The group reorganized in 1956 as the Association for Professional Broadcasting Education (APBE). At this point, the organization’s purpose was to combine broadcasters and educators through an affiliation with the National Association of Broadcasters (NAB). In doing so, the APBE was working towards the goal of good career and liberal arts education in broadcasting. APBE began publishing Journal of Broadcasting, the quarterly scholarly journal, in the winter of 1956, and the Journal of Radio Studies (ISSN 1095-5046). In 1974, APBE changed its name to the Broadcast Education Association (BEA).

== See also ==
- Center for Intercultural Dialogue
