= James E. Katz =

James E. Katz is an American communication scholar and social scientist. He is the Feld Professor of Emerging Media at Boston University's College of Communication, where he founded the Division of Emerging Media Studies and directs the Project on AI and the Future. He was one of the earliest scholars to conduct national empirical surveys of Internet and mobile phone use in the United States.

== Education and career ==
Katz earned his Ph.D. in sociology from Rutgers University. He held postdoctoral fellowships at MIT as a National Science Foundation Fellow and at Harvard University's Kennedy School of Government.

From 1986 to 1998, Katz served as a researcher at Bell Communications Research (Bellcore), where he was awarded the title Distinguished Member of Staff and served as editor-in-chief of Human Communication Research in 2009-2012 where he emphasized exploration of new issues in the field..

He later joined Rutgers University as a faculty member. He became Board of Governors Distinguished Professor of Communication and chaired the Department of Communication for two terms. He also founded the Center for Mobile Communication Studies at Rutgers in 2004 the first academic center devoted to the study of mobile media and society. He also edited the Handbook of Mobile Communication Studies (MIT Press, 2008) and organized conferences on the topic, contributing to the development of mobile communication as a field of study.

In 2012, Katz joined Boston University as the Feld Professor of Emerging Media and founded its doctoral program in emerging media and its Division of Emerging Media Studies.

== Research ==
=== The Syntopia Project and internet sociology ===
Beginning in 1995, Katz and Philip Aspden initiated the Syntopia Project, an early program using national random telephone surveys to examine the social effects of Internet use in the United States. Ronald E. Rice joined in 2000. Surveys conducted in 1995, 1996, 1997, and 2000 compared users and non-users on civic involvement and social interaction. The findings did not support claims that Internet use led to social isolation. Katz described the Internet as supplementing, rather than replacing, social capital. The project also identified “Internet dropouts,” referring to individuals who discontinued use after initial adoption.

=== Mobile communication and occupational bifurcation ===
Katz conducted early empirical research on mobile communication in the United States, including a 1995 national survey of beeper and mobile phone users while at Bellcore. The study examined everyday use of mobile devices and introduced the concept of occupational bifurcation, in which higher-status professionals experienced increased mobility, while lower-status workers experienced greater managerial oversight.

=== Obscene and harassing telephone calls ===
In a 1994 article, Katz reported findings from a nationally representative survey of obscene and harassing telephone calls. The study distinguished between random and targeted callers and found that women were the primary targets, though some men also reported such calls.

== Theoretical frameworks ==
=== Apparatgeist ===
With Mark Aakhus, Katz co-developed Apparatgeist theory, which proposes that use of personal communication technologies reflects common social patterns across cultures, particularly for coordination and symbolic expression.

=== Trust bifurcation and AI research ===
A research in 2024 and 2026 described a “trust bifurcation” in public views of artificial intelligence, in which systems are seen as capable but less benevolent.

Katz also co-developed the Robot Rights and Responsibilities (RRR) Scale to measure perceptions of the moral status of autonomous agents.

=== Artificial intelligence and society ===
Katz's research on artificial intelligence has examined public attitudes toward trust in AI systems, AI decision-making, and perceptions of autonomous technologies. His studies found that participants often distinguished between AI capability and trust, while also expressing reservations about AI systems in roles involving social judgment and decision-making. His work on robot rights also explored how perceptions of autonomy influence moral evaluations of artificial entities.

== Honors and awards ==
- Frederick Williams Prize (2021)
- Ogburn Career Achievement Award (2011), American Sociological Association
- Fulbright Distinguished Chair (2009), in Twentieth-Century Communications History (Italy)
- Honorary Doctorate (Dr.h.c., 2013), Budapest University of Technology and Economics
- Fellow, American Association for the Advancement of Science (AAAS), elected 2008
- Andrew W. Mellon Foundation Scholar Award (2002–2003).

Katz's 1999 book Connections: Social and Cultural Studies of the Telephone in American Life was selected as one of the American Library Association's Outstanding Academic Titles, and his co-authored volume Congress and National Energy Policy (1984) was nominated for the American Political Science Association's Gladys M. Kammerer Award for the best publication in the field of U.S. national policy.

== Selected bibliography ==
=== Books ===
- Katz, James E. Connections: Social and Cultural Studies of the Telephone in American Life. Transaction Publishers, 1999. (ALA Outstanding Academic Title)
- Katz, James E., and Ronald E. Rice. Social Consequences of Internet Use: Access, Involvement, and Interaction. MIT Press, 2002.
- Katz, James E., and Mark Aakhus (eds.). Perpetual Contact: Mobile Communication, Private Talk, Public Performance. Cambridge University Press, 2002.
- Katz, James E. (ed.). Magic in the Air: Mobile Communication and the Transformation of Social Life. Transaction Publishers, 2006.
- Katz, James E. (ed.). Handbook of Mobile Communication Studies. MIT Press, 2008.
- Katz, James E. (ed.). Mobile Communication: Dimensions of Social Policy. Transaction Publishers, 2011.
- Katz, James E., Wayne LaBar, and Ellen Lynch (eds.). Technology and Creativity: Social Media, Mobiles and Museums. MuseumsEtc, 2011.
- Katz, James E., Michael Barris, and Anshul Jain. The Social Media President: Barack Obama and the Politics of Digital Engagement. Palgrave Macmillan, 2013.

=== Selected articles and chapters ===
- "Empirical and theoretical dimensions of obscene phone calls to women in the United States." Human Communication Research, 1994.
- "Individual rights advocacy in tobacco control policies: An assessment and recommendation." Tobacco Control: An International Journal, 14(ii): ii31–ii37, 2005.
- Fox, Brion J., and James E. Katz. "Individual rights advocacy in tobacco control: Help or hindrance?" Tobacco Control: An International Journal, 14(ii): ii1–ii2, 2005.
- "Tobacco control policies." Society, 43(3): 25–32, 2006. doi:10.1007/BF02687592.
- "Conclusion: Making meaning of mobiles—a theory of Apparatgeist" (with Mark Aakhus). In Perpetual Contact, pp. 301–318. Cambridge University Press, 2002. doi:10.1017/CBO9780511489471.023.
- "Mobile gazing two-ways: Visual layering as an emerging mobile communication service." Mobile Media & Communication, 1(1): 129–133, 2013.
- "Attitudes toward robots suitability for various jobs as affected by robot appearance" (with Daniel Halpern). Behaviour & Information Technology, 33(9): 1–13, 2014. doi:10.1080/0144929X.2013.783115.
- "Political and developmental correlates of social media participation in government" (with Daniel Halpern). International Journal of Public Administration, 36(1): 1–15, 2013. doi:10.1080/01900692.2012.713286.
- "News blogging in cross-cultural contexts" (with Chih-Hui Lai). Knowledge, Technology & Policy, 22(2): 95–107, 2009. doi:10.1007/s12130-009-9072-1.
- The Robot Rights and Responsibilities Scale. 2024.
