= European Communication Research and Education Association =

The European Communication Research and Education Association (ECREA) is a scholarly association focused on the study of media, telecommunications, and informatics, including relevant approaches from the human and social sciences. It strives to promote the quality of communication research and teaching in higher education across Europe. For 2024, ECREA has more than 3,700 members. Currently, ECREA's legal seat is located in Brussels, Belgium. ECREA is similar in nature to other learned societies such as the International Communication Association (ICA) and the International Association for Media and Communication Research (IAMCR).

== Governance ==
The General Assembly is the governing body of ECREA that exercises the ultimate authority over the implementation of the association's decisions. The General Assembly is composed of all active institutional and individual members. With simple majority every four years the General Assembly elects the Governing Body (Executive Board) which, in turn, appoints from its members (at least 3 and maximum 15) the President, the Vice President, the General-Secretary and the Treasurer. Together, they form the Bureau, which decides on day-to-day management and organisational matters and acts on behalf of the associations in legal cases. In addition, the Forum of Section, Temporary Working Groups and Networks, and the Advisory Board that can be consulted by the executive board and the Bureau.

== Conferences and Doctoral Summer School ==
Every other year, ECREA organizes and sponsors a large-scale international conference, dubbed the European Communication Conference ECC. Each conference features keynote speeches, alongside parallel sessions organised by the Sections as well as panel discussions revolving around pre-set topics.

The venue of the conference is usually a big European city. These are the conference locations and dates;

- first ECC: Amsterdam (24–26 November 2005),
- second ECC: Barcelona (25–28 November 2008),
- third ECC Hamburg (12–15 October 2010)
- fourth ECC: Istanbul (24–27 October 2012),
- fifth ECC: Lisbon (12–15 November 2014).
- sixth ECC: Prague (9–12 November 2016).
- seventh ECC: Lugano (31 October – November 3, 2018).
- eighth ECC: online (6–9 September, 2021).
- ninth ECC: Aarhus (19–22 September, 2022).
- tenth ECC: Ljubljana (24–27 September, 2024).

In the uneven years, ECREA's Sections, Temporary Working Groups, and Networks each organize a smaller event.

Every year, a Doctoral Summer School is organised, during which leading experts and junior scholars discuss the PhD. projects of the participating junior scholars. These so-called student feedback workshops are combined with lectures, presentations, workshops, and seminars. The ECREA Doctoral Summer School represents a supportive environment for up-and-coming European researchers which, it is thought, boosts their early career development. The Doctoral Summer School has a long history, even before ECREA became involved, and was organised in the following locations:

- Grenoble, France (1992–1996)
- Madrid, Spain (1997)
- Lund, Sweden (1998)
- London, United Kingdom (1999–2003)
- Helsinki, Finland (2004)
- Tartu, Estonia (2005–2009)
- Ljubljana, Slovenia (2010–2012)
- Bremen, Germany (2013–2015)
- Milan, Italy (2016–2018)
- Tartu, Estonia (2019–2020)
- Cádiz, Spain (2021–2022)
- Roskilde, Denmark (2023–2024)

== Book series ==
ECREA manages two-book series. The "ECREA Book Series" was published by Intellect until 2012. A new book series, the "Routledge Studies in European Communication Research and Education" was started in 2013. In 2023, a new book series will Palgrave was started.

All books published in both series feature original work by ECREA members.

The intellectual work of the Doctoral Summer School is traditionally published in The Researching and Teaching Communication Series. An edited volume, usually edited by senior scholars, includes what is deemed the best student work alongside the bulk of lectures given by established scholars. These edited volumes are accessible free of charge at the website of the series.

== Publications ==
The following books have so far been published:

- The European Information Society: A Reality Check (2003) edited by Jan Servaes (Intellect)
- Towards a Sustainable Information Society. Deconstructing WSIS (2005) edited by Jan Servaes and Nico Carpentier (Intellect)
- Reclaiming the media: communication rights and democratic media roles (2006) edited by Bart Cammaerts and Nico Carpentier (Intellect)
- Finding the Right Place on the Map: Central and Eastern European Media Change in a Global Perspective (2008) edited by Karol Jakubowicz and Miklós Sükösd (Intellect)
- Press Freedom and Pluralism in Europe. Concepts and Conditions (2009), edited by Andrea Czepek, Melanie Hellwig, and Eva Nowak (Intellect)
- Gendered Transformations. Theory and Practices on Gender and Media (2010), edited by Tonny Krijnen, Claudia Alvares and Sofie Van Bauwel (Intellect)
- Trends in Communication Policy Research. New Theories, Methods & Subjects (2012), edited by Natascha Just and Manuel Puppis (Intellect)
- From NWICO to WSIS: 30 Years of Communication Geopolitics Actors and Flows, Structures and Divides (2012), edited by Divina Frau-Meigs, Jérémie Nicey, Patricio Tupper, Michael Palmer and Julia Pohle (Intellect)
- The Social Use of Media. Cultural and Social Scientific Perspectives on Audience Research (2012), edited by Helena Bilandzic and Geoffroy Patriarche and Paul Traudt (Intellect)
- Citizen Voices. Performing Public Participation in Science and Environment Communication (2012), edited by Louise Phillips, Anabela Carvalho and Julie Doyle. (Intellect)
- Selling War. The Role of the Mass Media in Hostile Conflicts form World War I to the ‘War on Terror’ (2012), edited by Josef Seethaler, Matthias Karmasin, Gabriele Melischek and Romy Wöhlert (Intellect)
- The Independence of the Media and its Regulatory Agencies. Shedding New Light on Formal and Actual Independence against the National Context (June 2013), edited by Wolfgang Schulz, Kristina Irion and Peggy Valcke (Intellect)
- Audience Research Methodologies. Between Innovation and Consolidation (July 2013), edited by Geoffroy Patriarche, Helena Bilandzic, Jakob Linaa Jensen and Jelena Jurišić (Routledge)
- Audience Transformations.Shifting Audience Positions in Late Modernity (July 2013), edited by Nico Carpentier, Kim Christian Schrøder and Lawrie Hallett (Routledge)
- Multiplayer.The Social Aspects of Digital Gaming (October 2013), edited by Thorsten Quandt and Sonja Kröger (Routledge)
- Revitalising Audience Research (November 2014), edited by Frauke Zeller, Cristina Ponte, Brian O'Neill (Routledge)
- Mapping Foreign Correspondence in European Countries (November 2014), edited by Georgios Terzis (Routledge)
- Radio Audiences and Participation in the Age of Network Society (December 2014), edited by Tiziano Bonini and Belén Monclús (Routledge)
- Interactive Digital Narrative: History, Theory and Practice (April 2015), edited by Hartmut Koenitz, Gabriele Ferri, Mads Haahr, Diğdem Sezen, Tonguç İbrahim Sezen (Routledge)
- Mediated Intimacies: Connectivities, Relationalities and Proximities (2017), edited by Rikke Andreassen, Michael Nebeling Petersen, Katherine Harrison, Tobias Raun
- (Mis)Understanding Political Participation: Digital Practices, New Forms of Participation and the Renewal of Democracy (2017), edited by Jeffrey Wimmer, Cornelia Wallner, Rainer Winter, Karoline Oelsner
- MEDIA ACCOUNTABILITY IN THE ERA OF POST-TRUTH POLITICS: EUROPEAN CHALLENGES AND PERSPECTIVES (2019), edited by Tobias Eberwein, Susanne Fengler, Matthias Karmasin
- Models of Communication. Theoretical and Philosophical Approaches (2020), edited by Mats Bergman, Kęstas Kirtiklis, Johan Siebers
- GENER AND SEXUALITY IN THE EUROPEAN MEDIA. EXPLORING DIFFERENT CONTEXTS THROUGH CONCEPTUALISATIONS OF AGE (2021), edited by Cosimo Marco Scarcelli, Despina Chronaki, Sara De Vuyst, Sergio Villanueva Baselga
