= International Communication Association =

Academic association

- Formation: January 1, 1950
- Headquarters: Washington, D.C, United States
- Members: 4,500
- Website: www.icahdq.org

The International Communication Association (ICA) is an academic association for scholars interested in the study, teaching and application of all aspects of human and mediated communication.

ICA communicates within the association and with others interested in the field through various channels. The association publishes six major, peer-reviewed journals. Members receive a monthly electronic newsletter. ICA holds an annual conference at which hundreds of research papers are presented and over 2,000 scholars from all over the world participate. ICA recognizes outstanding contributions to the field through awards and fellowship programs.

== History ==
ICA was founded on January 1, 1950, in Austin, Texas, as the National Society for the Study of Communication (NSSC), a subsidiary organization of the Speech Association of America (now the National Communication Association). The following year, NSSC published the first issue of its official journal, Journal of Communication.

In 1967, the NSSC formally separated from the SSA and opened its membership to scholars outside of the U.S. It changed its name two years later to the International Communication Association.

ICA relocated its offices from Austin, TX to Washington, D.C., in 2001. The association purchased a permanent headquarters in Washington in 2006.

== Journals ==
The International Communication Association's publishing partner is currently Oxford University Press. It is currently the publisher of seven journals.

- Journal of Communication
- Human Communication Research
- Communication Theory
- Communication, Culture & Critique
- Journal of Computer-Mediated Communication
- Annals of the International Communication Association (currently in partnership with Taylor & Francis)
- Global Perspectives in Communication

== Fellows ==
ICA fellows include Charles Berger, Jennings Bryant, Patrice Buzzanell, Robert T. Craig, Brenda Dervin, Nicole Ellison, Lawrence Grossberg, Klaus Krippendorff, Kathleen Hall Jamieson, Sonia Livingstone, Joseph Walther, Patti Valkenburg, and Bruce Bimber.

== See also ==
- Communication studies
- Association for Education in Journalism and Mass Communication
- Central States Communication Association
- National Communication Association
- European Communication Research and Education Association
- Center for Intercultural Dialogue
