= National Communication Association =

- Abbreviation: NCA
- Formation: November 1914
- Type: Not-for-profit academic association
- Website: natcom.org

The National Communication Association (NCA) of the United States is a not-for-profit association of academics in the field of communication.

== Organization ==
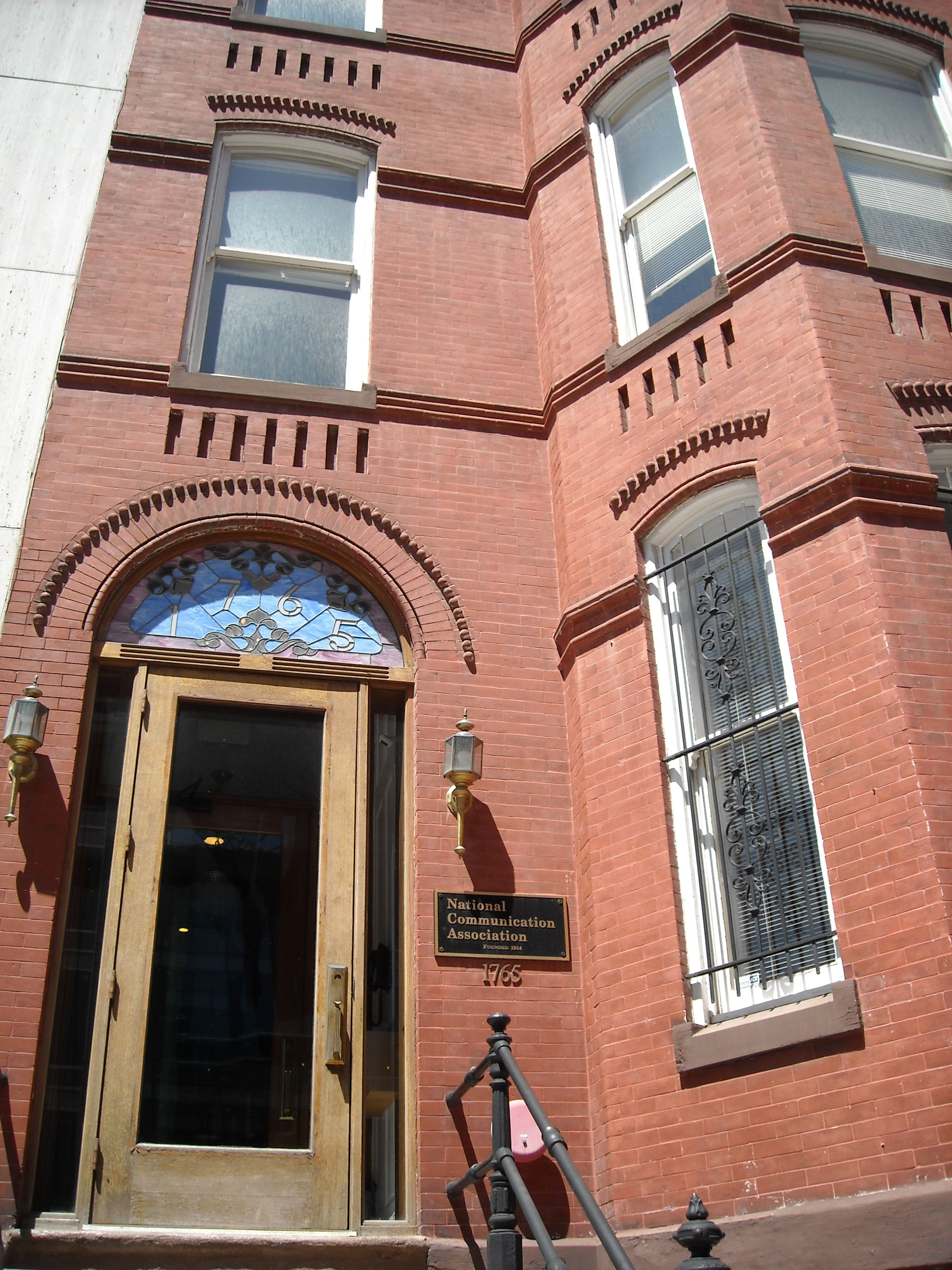
NCA headquarters in Washington, D.C.

NCA is governed by the Legislative Assembly, which meets during the NCA Annual Convention. Between annual meetings of the Legislative Assembly, the association is governed by the executive committee. In addition, NCA has standing committees and councils: the Convention Committee, the Nominating Committee, the Leadership Development Committee, the Resolutions Committee, the Teaching and Learning Council, the Finance Committee, the Publications Council, the Research Council, and the Inclusion, Diversity, Equity, and Access Council.

NCA is composed of 49 divisions, which cover various areas of study; seven sections, which address professional settings; and six caucuses, which represent specific demographic or socially defined segments of the NCA membership. It supports two national student organizations: Lambda Pi Eta (LPH) and Sigma Chi Eta (SCH).

== Convention ==
NCA sponsors an annual convention on communication research and teaching. The NCA Annual Convention has been held every year since 1915, except for 1918, when it was cancelled because of the U.S. involvement in World War I. The site of the convention changes every year and is determined five to seven years in advance. The convention site rotates among the western, midwestern, and eastern regions of the United States.

== Publications ==
With its publishing partner, Routledge, NCA publishes 12 academic journals:

- Communication and Critical/Cultural Studies
- Communication and Democracy
- Communication and Race
- Communication Education
- Communication Monographs
- Communication Teacher
- Critical Studies in Media Communication
- Journal of Applied Communication Research
- Journal of International and Intercultural Communication
- Quarterly Journal of Speech
- Review of Communication
- Text and Performance Quarterly

NCA regularly publishes Communication Currents essays, which summarize recent research published in NCA's journals. In 2020, NCA's quarterly magazine, Spectra, transitioned from a print magazine to an online magazine. Spectra includes summaries of recently published research articles, announcements from the Association, job advertisements, news about members, and news from affiliated organizations. NCA launched Communication Matters: The NCA Podcast in 2020.

== See also ==
- American Council of Learned Societies
- American Association for the Advancement of Science
- National Coalition Against Censorship
- ScienceDebate.org
