= Outline of communication =

Overview of and topical guide to communication

The following outline is provided as an overview of and topical guide to communication:

Communication – purposeful activity of exchanging information and meaning across space and time using various technical or natural means, whichever is available or preferred. Communication requires a sender, a message, a medium and a recipient, although the receiver does not have to be present or aware of the sender's intent to communicate at the time of communication; thus communication can occur across vast distances in time and space.

== Essence of communication ==
- Communication theory
- Development communication
- Information
- Information theory
- Semiotics

== Branches of communication ==
=== Types of communication ===
==== Types of communication by scope ====
- Intercultural communication
- International communication
- Interpersonal communication
- Intrapersonal communication
- Mass communication
- Nonverbal communication
- Verbal communication
- Organizational communication

==== Types of communication by mode ====
- Computer-mediated communication
  - Email
- Conversation
- Mail
- Mass media
  - Book
  - Film
  - Journalism
  - News media
  - Newspaper
  - Technical writing
  - Video
- Telecommunication (outline)
  - Morse Code
  - Radio
  - Telegraphy
  - Telephone
  - Television
  - Internet
- Verbal communication
- Writing
  - Social Network

=== Fields of communication ===
- Communication studies
- Cognitive linguistics
- Conversation analysis
- Crisis communication
- Discourse analysis
- Environmental communication
- Health communication
- Interpersonal communication
- Linguistics (outline)
- Mass communication
- Mediated cross-border communication
- Organizational communication
- Political communication
- Pragmatics
- Risk communication
- Science communication
- Semiotics
- Sociolinguistics

== Theories, schools, and approaches ==
Theories of communication

- Agenda-setting theory
- Content analysis
- Community structure theory
- Conversation analysis
- Coordinated management of meaning
- Critical theory
- Cues-filtered-out theory
- Cultivation theory
- Cultural studies
- Cybernetics
- Decision downloading
- Diffusion of innovations
- Elaboration likelihood model
- Ethnomethodology
- Framing
- Hermeneutics
- Hypodermic needle model
- Heuristic-Systematic Model
- Hyperpersonal Model
- Information theory
- Knowledge gap hypothesis
- Media ecology
- Narrative paradigm
- Network analysis
- Nonviolent Communication
- Opinion leadership
- Political economy
- Priming
- Problematic Integration Theory
- Relational dialectics
- Scheme (linguistics)
- Social learning theory
- Social construction of reality
- Social Identity model of Deindividuation Effects (SIDE)
- Social Information Processing theory
- Social Penetration Theory
- Spiral of silence
- Structuralism
- Symbolic interactionism
- Technology acceptance model
- Theory of cognitive dissonance
- Theory of Planned Behavior
- Theory of Reasoned Action
- Third-person effect
- Two-step flow of communication
- Uses and gratifications
- Uncertainty reduction theory

== History of communication ==
History of communication

- Cave painting
- Early postal systems
- Heliograph
- Historical linguistics
- History of alphabet
- History of the book
- History of computer science
- History of computing (see also Timeline of computing)
- History of computer hardware
- History of Internet
- History of linguistics
- History of mass media
- History of radio
- History of telegraphy
  - History of telegraph
- History of telephone
- History of television
- History of writing
- Ideograms
- Origin of language
- Petroglyphs
- Pictograms
- Proto-language
- Semaphore line
- Smoke signals

== General communication concepts ==
=== General topics of communication ===
- Autocommunication
- Empathy
- People skills
- Persuasion
- Propaganda
- Public speaking
- Reading
- Rhetoric
- Small-group communication
- Speech
- Translation
- Writing

=== General communication terms ===
- Censorship
- Community structure
- Cultural imperialism
- Democracy
- Dialectic
- Digital divide
- Freedom of the press
- Freedom of speech
- Hegemony
- Identity
- Imagined community
- Information society
- Late capitalism
- Media imperialism
- Morpheme
- Nationalism
- Phoneme
- Postmodernity
- Public sphere
- Semiotics
- Social capital
- Social network
- Sophist
- Stereotyping
- Stigma
- Syllable
- Transactive communication
- Universal service
- Avatar (virtual reality)

== Communication scholars ==
- Theodor Adorno
- Aristotle
- Roland Barthes
- Gregory Bateson
- Walter Benjamin
- Kenneth Burke
- Manuel Castells
- Cicero
- Noam Chomsky
- Karl W. Deutsch
- Walter Fisher
- George Gerbner
- G. Thomas Goodnight
- Jürgen Habermas
- Max Horkheimer
- Harold Innis
- Roman Jakobson
- Irving Janis
- Wendell Johnson
- D. Lawrence Kincaid
- Walter Lippman
- Juri Lotman
- Niklas Luhmann
- Herbert Marcuse
- George Herbert Mead
- Marshall McLuhan
- Desmond Morris
- Maxwell McCombs
- Walter J. Ong
- Vance Packard
- Charles Sanders Peirce
- Chaïm Perelman
- Plato
- Neil Postman
- Nora C. Quebral
- Quintilian
- I. A. Richards
- Everett M. Rogers
- Wilbur Schramm
- Thomas Sebeok
- Claude Shannon
- Deborah Tannen
- James W. Tankard, Jr.
- Warren Weaver
- Bob Woodward

== See also ==
- List of communications-related conferences
- Category:Communication journals
