= Uncertainty management theory =

Uncertainty management theory (UMT), developed by Dale Brashers, addresses the concept of uncertainty management. Several theories have been developed in an attempt to define uncertainty, identify its effects and establish strategies for managing it. Uncertainty management theory was the first theory to decline the idea that uncertainty is negative. It was developed and has been applied considering uncertainty neutral; neither positive nor negative. Although viewed as neutral, researchers of uncertainty management propose that uncertainty can be utilized strategically for beneficial purposes while also acknowledging that the effects of uncertainty can be harmful, espousing an approach that requires examination of each situation, the parties involved, the issues at stake and the desired objectives for determining the best method for managing uncertainty, with reduction being one of the many management techniques.

== Background ==
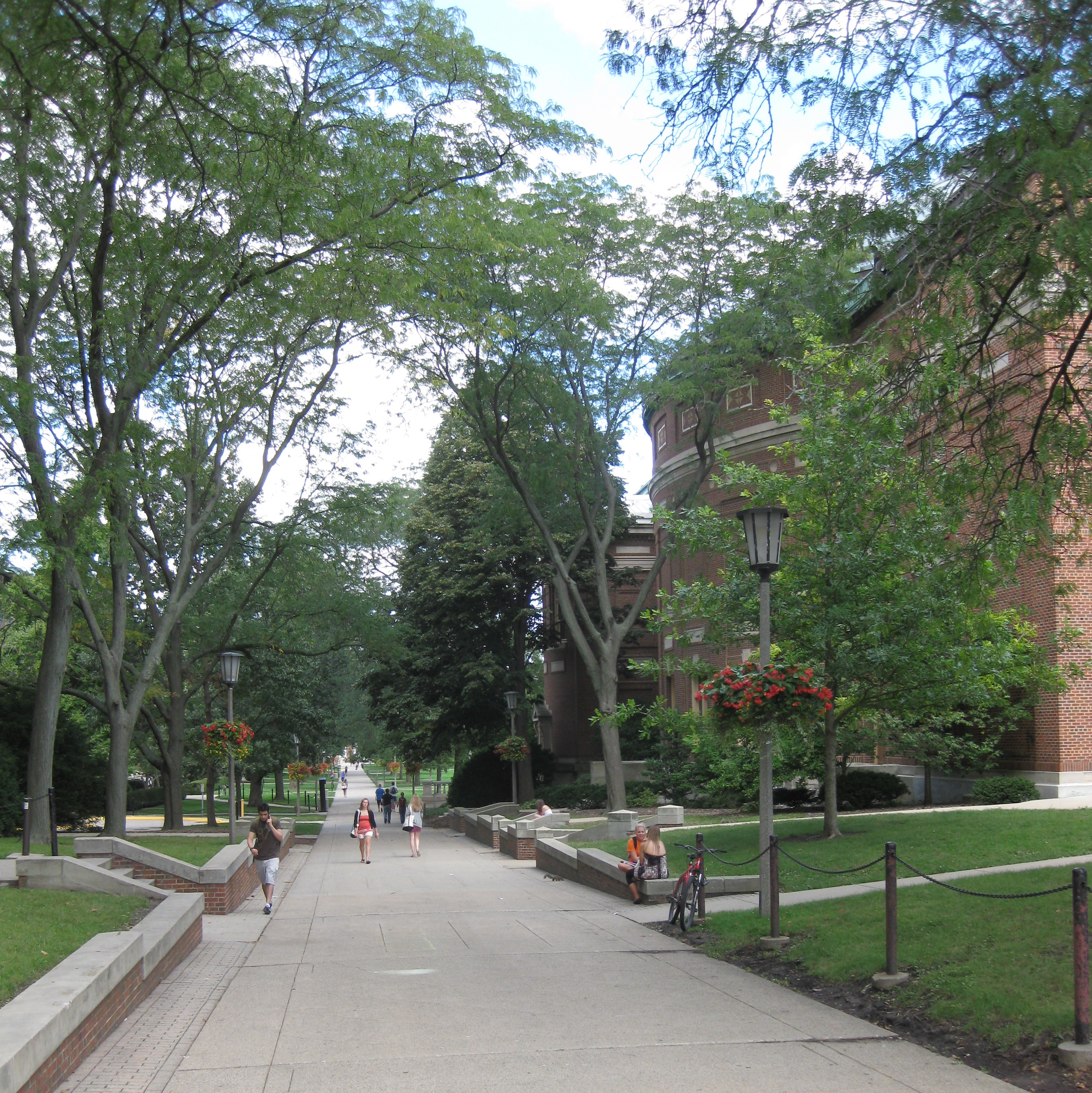
University of Illinois at Urbana Champaign

Uncertainty Management Theory (UMT) was developed by Dale Brashers, an associate professor of Speech Communication at the University of Illinois at Urbana Champaign. Brashers died in 2010 after spending more than 20 years researching uncertainty management. Before Brashers' work, the most prominent literature in the field of uncertainty management was that of Charles Berger. Berger's Uncertainty Reduction Theory (URT) continues to be the dominant theory of uncertainty management, with much of the additional work on this topic being a continuation of Berger's research. This includes the work of William Gudykunst, who continued with Berger's line of thinking, partnering together with him on Anxiety-Uncertainty Management (AUM) theory. Both of these theories focus on the idea that uncertainty produces anxiety. Because of the anxiety produced by heightened levels of uncertainty, individuals are highly motivated to reduce uncertainty. Uncertainty Reduction posits that individuals would rather receive bad news than continue in a state of uncertainty. This thinking was widely accepted, with uncertainty being studied almost exclusively through this lens before the introduction of UMT. With UMT, Brashers established that to fully understand the effects of uncertainty and how uncertainty contributes to various aspects of human life humanity must first move away from the idea that all uncertainty is negative. Brashers approached uncertainty as neutral (neither good nor bad), acknowledging that uncertainty reduction is one of many possible responses to situations that are lacking in the information necessary for full understanding. Brashers notes, however, that individuals will sometimes choose to remain in a state of uncertainty even though reduction opportunities are available.

== Aspects of uncertainty ==
Uncertainty is an unavoidable aspect of everyday life. The degree to which it is felt in a given situation varies among individuals. Because uncertainty is dependent upon perspective, "a person who believes himself or herself to be uncertain is uncertain." However, people have different appetites and tolerances for uncertainty. For some, the existence of uncertainty is stimulating or perhaps even exhilarating, whereas others can be highly motivated to reduce even the slightest degree of uncertainty. The idea of exhilarating uncertainty could best be illustrated by an individual's decision to participate in an extreme recreational activity such as skydiving, bungee jumping or parasailing. Personal tolerance for uncertainty will determine how willing a person is to invest when the likelihood of the desired outcome is unclear; whether this investment is monetary, relational or otherwise. Babrow (1992) applied this principle to research around uncertainty and probability, stating that uncertainty is at its peak when the probability of the outcome is at or near 50%; while extremely low or extremely high probability reduces uncertainty.

== Managing uncertainty in relationships ==
Interpersonal relationships have great application to the field of uncertainty management and arguably the widest appeal since everyone participates in the process of relating to others. In the initial stage of relationship development, individuals engage in heightened observation of the other party to reduce uncertainty about the suitability of the relationship's future. Individuals engage in self-disclosure and other forms of interaction, particularly in the early stages of relationships, often for the sole purpose of exploring how the other party will respond. Much of the research and writing on relational communication focuses on the idea that through interaction, society comes to learn more about itself and others. The focus of uncertainty management has been not only on how people interact, but how they gather information about other people through interaction, what is done with that information, and why it is done. UMT posits that even in the early stages of relationship, one might choose to not self-disclose or to not seek self-disclosure to allow a level of uncertainty to remain.

Uncertainty is generally the result of a situation being unclear, unpredictable and/or complicated, with needed information being scarce or contradictory, and the people involved lacking confidence in the amount or reliability of the information they possess about this situation. A state of uncertainty can be temporary or long-term. In relationship development, uncertainty is generally reduced at a rapid pace early in the relationship as the two parties get to know one another. This slows as the relationship progresses and the parties have fewer withheld disclosures to present. The slowdown can also be the result of one or both of the parties reaching the desired level of intimacy and thus withholding additional personal information to not further the development of the relationship. Although this withholding reduces uncertainty around where the relationship is going, it can increase uncertainty or at least maintain uncertainty levels for the other party about the areas of the individual's life and being that are no longer being disclosed. Uncertainty is often the result of multiple contributing factors that are connected to how they can affect different aspects of an individual's life. The same can be true for the functioning of an organization.

In relationships, individuals are motivated to explore two types of uncertainty. First, predictive uncertainty reveals what one can expect from the other party going forward. An individual desires to be able to predict with some degree of certainty how the other party is going to behave in a specific circumstance or how they are going to respond to information the individual discloses. Second, explanatory uncertainty serves to identify the reasons behind past behavior. People want to be able to make sense of the other party's words or behavior. If their behavior is undesirable and the individual can identify what prompted that behavior, they can alter their behavior or words to not continue prompting the behavior they no longer desire from the other party.

== Application ==
UMT applies across a wide spectrum of topics and experiences, most notably health, organizational and interpersonal settings.

=== Healthcare ===
Healthcare, and particularly health communication, is an arena for UMT. Researchers studying health have employed UMT as a way to understand and communicate processes including medicine, technology, payer concerns and political ramifications. This work has resulted in what Brashers referred to as the "culture of chronic illness," where constant testing and evaluation of people's health almost always results in the identification of some level of sickness, infection or disease; resulting in two groups of people: the "chronically ill" and the "worried well." Much work was completed in the late 1990s regarding the effect of uncertainty on the rapidly increasing HIV diagnosed population. Uncertainty was of particular concern with the communication methods that were utilized by healthcare providers with their HIV patients. The role of medical malpractice litigation has also contributed to the complexity of communication between healthcare providers and patients regarding diagnosis and treatment options.

=== Organizational ===
Although not as frequently cited, UMT also has widespread applicability to the organizational setting (i.e., the workplace). Research in this setting has included examining the role of uncertainty in unhealthy workplace behavior. Other work has examined expected employee behaviors, channels of communication and deviant employee behavior. In looking at uncertainty in the context of the workplace, Brashers relates uncertainty to ambiguity where there are multiple explanations of behavior or phenomenon; he further states that "ambiguity is not always undesired and individuals sometimes use it for strategic purposes." Sometimes these strategies are for self-preservation or the retention of power, where individuals create and/or maintain ambiguity to protect their status quo. This same line of thinking has been applied to perpetrators in the workplace who cloud inappropriate behavior with enough uncertainty to disguise what would otherwise be viewed as sexual harassment. Other uncertainty management theorists, particularly those who view uncertainty as an unhealthy dynamic. view the workplace as the primary venue in need of uncertainty reduction. This argument is particularly relevant when evaluating uncertainty around the decision-making process for organizations.

=== Interpersonal ===
People in relationships can frequently experience uncertainty. This uncertainty is not only related to the other party, but even self behavior imposes uncertainty on our relationships that often are unintended. Whether it is the result of notable cultural differences or simply family influence in the way individuals relate to others or show affection, these differences leave the other party guessing at to their intended meaning. Not all uncertainty is negative. Many individuals value the spontaneity that results from some degree of uncertainty in interpersonal relationships or how those relationships are managed.
