= Problematic integration theory =

Theory of communication

Problematic Integration Theory is a theory of communication that addresses the processes and dynamics of how people receive, evaluate, and respond to information and experiences. The premises of PI are based on the view that message processing, specifically the development of probabilistic and evaluative orientations (our perceptions of something's likelihood of occurring and its value, respectively), is a social and cultural construction. In situations where there is agreement between probabilistic orientation (a person's constructed belief about an object's likelihood, i.e., how likely something is to occur) and evaluative orientation (a person's constructed belief about an object's value), integration is in harmony, i.e., not problematic. However, when there is disagreement between these orientations about an object (i.e., an event, thing, person, idea, outcome, etc.), then integration becomes problematic. This disharmony leads to conflict and discomfort, which can manifest itself as cognitive, communicative, affective, and/or motivational.

== History ==
Austin Babrow first introduced the theory of Problematic Integration (PI) in 1992. Babrow brought together a diverse and interdisciplinary literature (from the field of communication and related disciplines, like psychology, sociology, and philosophy) to serve as building blocks for his new theory. Among the theoretical underpinnings that support PI are: uncertainty reduction theory; the theory of belief in a just world; analysis of decision-making; the theory of motivation and self-esteem; and cognitive dissonance. However, despite integrating elements from these theories, PI has striking differences (e.g., unlike URT, PI does not assume that uncertainty is an undesirable situation, nor does it suggest that resolution of uncertainty is always necessary or desirable).

== Concepts ==
Problematic Integration is a type of message-processing communication theory that relates to theories of decision making and persuasion. Problematic Integration Theory (PI) proposes that: (1) people orient themselves to the world by forming both probabilistic and evaluative orientations; (2) that probability and evaluation are not independent from one another; (3) that probability and evaluation are socially based and socially constructed, and that probability and evaluation are integral to our daily experience; and, (4) that integration of these orientations can be problematic. Probabilistic orientation is an assessment of the likelihood of an event or outcome. Evaluative orientation is an assessment of the favorability of an outcome. Often, assessments of probability and value are cooperative and easily integrated. However, as the theory's title implies, there are occasions when integration becomes problematic. PI proposes that integration becomes more difficult as:

1. clarity of object probability decreases
2. object value conflicts increase
3. or, there is an increase in the divergence between object expectation and desire

Essentially, problematic integration is what we experience when our probabilistic and evaluative orientations conflict with one another, causing instability and disharmony. Conflict arising from problematic integration may or may not be significant. The more important a value and the more central an issue (or object, to use PI terminology) is to one's beliefs or cultural values, the more likely that problematic integration will cause greater discomfort.

=== Assumptions of problematic integration theory ===
Babrow identified four distinct manifestations, or forms, of problematic integration:

1. Divergence - occurs when there is a difference between reality and our desired outcome, and refers to a situation in which the outcome is uncertain or unknown
2. Ambiguity - occurs when it is unclear or highly uncertain what the probability or value of an object is. Babrow stated that in such situations, the outcome is unknown, and the probability of the outcome is restricted.
3. Ambivalence - occurs when an individual has to choose between two similarly valued or mutually exclusive alternatives.
4. Impossibility - has a firm outcome. A response of denial can occur, and this can lead to conflict.

The first of these integrative predicaments, divergence, arises when there is a discrepancy between what we believe to be true or to be likely to occur and what we want to be true (the desired outcome). Ambiguity arises when the probability or value of an object (i.e., situation, outcome, thing, etc.) is unclear or highly uncertain. Babrow explained that "in ambiguous situations, neither the outcome, nor the probability of the outcome is known, though the latter has restrictions" (Babrow, 1992, p. 112). Uncertainty occurs when an unknown factor obscures or complicates the development of one's orientation (probability and evaluation) toward an outcome. Ambiguity has also been described as uncertainty about what is unknown. Ambivalence is borne from one of two conditions: (1) an individual is forced to choose between two similarly valued alternatives; or (2) an individual is forced to choose between mutually exclusive alternatives. The last form of PI, impossibility, occurs upon the realization or belief that an outcome will not happen. Impossibility is recognized as different from a form of divergence, because only impossibility denotes a sense of certainty. Responses to impossibility can range from a sense of futility to one of increased motivation to deny the impossibility. All of these situations give rise to conflict.

=== The role of communication in problematic integration theory ===
Communication is both a source of, a medium, and a method for resolving conflict. Communication is a source of problematic integration in that knowledge and evaluative orientations are the result of communication, probabilistic and evaluative orientations are based on and developed through message and meaning-making (forms of communication), and communication is itself "an object of thought" and is therefore an object "of probabilistic and evaluative orientations." It is also possible that a person experiencing problematic integration will seek new information or new sources of information to bolster or reinforce a desired probabilistic or evaluative orientation. This could also be seen as engaging in a form of cognitive dissonance. Communication is seen as a medium of problematic integration because communication inherently involves or is based on probabilistic and evaluative orientations, or communication is about probability and value. Communication is influenced by and formed from culture; thus, communication is a medium of PI, and the formation of probabilistic and evaluative orientations derives from cultural frameworks. Lastly, communication is a resource for PI as we try to resolve and manage conflict caused by problematic integration through communication (internal, interpersonal, etc.).

Because communication may be a source, medium, and/or method for resolving problematic integration, it is possible for conflict to manifest as "extended chains" of problematic integration. Such extended chains occur through forms, foci, and layers of experience. By extended chains, it is meant that experiences of problematic integration and efforts to resolve problematic integration may lead to development of a new form of PI. As conflict between probability and value develops around a focal point (or topic), it can lead to conflict regarding a new topic (e.g., stress and anxiety about earning an end-of-year bonus at work can lead to new worries about personal finances, sense of self-worth, and/or one's status and career prospects at work). Problematic integration becomes shared (or chained) through layers of experience when people discuss and relate their struggles with others. In this process of communicating our conflicts, others may share in our problematic integration through empathy and sympathy. Babrow proposed that communication becomes more important to resolve problematic integration as the conflict or integration becomes more difficult.

=== Critique and analysis ===
As mentioned above, Problematic Integration Theory is a type of communication theory that examines how we make meaning of information and experiences, and how we handle uncertainty. PI differs from Uncertainty Reduction Theory and other axiomatic and predictive communication theories in a number of ways. PI proposes that there are numerous and varied meanings of the term uncertainty. Unlike URT, PI predicts that experiencing uncertainty does not automatically lead to a desire to reduce the uncertainty. Further, PI proposes that: (1) uncertainty is not always "bad; (2) uncertainty has a single or narrow meaning; (3) reduction of uncertainty is not always possible; (4) any resolution of uncertainty is not necessarily final; and (5) integrative dilemmas do not necessarily have an identifiable or singular cause.

Problematic Integration Theory (PI) falls under the socio-psychological and socio-cultural communication traditions. PI began with a focus on intra- and inter-personal contexts, but has been applicable in many contexts, including interpersonal, small group, and organizational; thus, it has a broad scope of application. PI is considered an interpretive/hermeneutic approach of theory rather than positivistic/empirical (i.e., predictive) or critical.

=== Problematic Integration Theory and Pregnancy ===
Ashley Archiopoli applies Problematic Integration Theory in her research to examine how pregnant women have been able to cope and build resilience during the COVID-19 pandemic. Through a qualitative analysis of interviews with pregnant women, Archiopoli found that these women used strategies including reframing, using support systems, and engaging in self-care to manage the impact of the pandemic on their pregnancy.

Kami A. Kosenko uses Problematic Integration Theory to explore the various ways that individuals experience infertility and the impact this has on their sense of identity and belonging. She examines the various forms of integration that can be experienced in the context of infertility – including positive, negative and ambivalent – and the various factors which shape the integration process, such as the couple relationship, social environment, the medical system, and the individual's own beliefs and values. She argues that infertility can be a source of disruption to an individual's sense of identity, and that focusing on the integration process and the various factors which influence it can help individuals better manage their experience of infertility.

Beth Sundstrom uses Problematic Integration Theory to analyze how pregnancy ambivalence and contraceptive effectiveness can be integrated in contraceptive decision-making. Understanding how these PI factors interact with each other can help provide more effective contraceptive counseling and improve contraceptive outcomes. (Sundstrom et al., 2017)

=== Problematic Integration Theory and Chronic Illness ===
PI has been used within the realm of Health Communication studies in order to assess methods of educating and communicating with patients facing a variety of chronic or life-threatening conditions. In 2003, Babrow received the prestigious Woolbert Award for scholarship of exceptional originality and influence from the National Communication Association for his work with PI.

Maria G. Checton's findings indicate that a patient and their partner mutually influence each other in the management of chronic illness, and that communication and emotional support are vital components of successful management. Furthermore, participants identified the need for medical professionals to acknowledge the partner's role and provide support to both the patient and their partner. This highlights the importance of integrating the patient and their partner in the management of chronic illness, which is what problematic integration theory aims to do.

Jennifer E. Ohs uses Problematic integration theory to understand how family members come to a shared understanding of an end-of-life decision, how they experience challenges in the process, and how they respond to those challenges. Communication, negotiation, and understanding between family members may require outside help such as professional counseling or spiritual guidance to facilitate the process. Successful integration of perspectives is essential for families to reach a decision about end-of-life care.

Elisia L. Cohen applies PI to her research to understand the complexities of the experience of African American women who are treated for cancer. In her research, Cohen found that African American women often confront a double stigma when dealing with cancer and must negotiate their identity in order to claim cancer as their own. This process of naming and claiming cancer has been found to be an important part of the healing process for African American women, as it allows them to take ownership of their experience and create a sense of agency. Through this study, Cohen provides an important insight into the complexities of cancer and the role of identity in the healing process.

=== Related work: Cognitive Dissonance Theory & Uncertainty Management Theory ===
PI theory is an extension of Cognitive Dissonance Theory. Cognitive Dissonance Theory is a psychological concept that explains how individuals attempt to reduce the discomfort they experience when they are presented with conflicting beliefs, ideas, or values. It suggests that people will attempt to make things consistent to reduce the dissonance they feel. We can differentiate between the two theories by thinking about Cognitive Dissonance Theory as a theory that focuses specifically on the psychological discomfort of conflicting beliefs, ideas, or values. Problematic Integration Theory examines how individuals perceive, evaluate, and respond to uncertain situations, without necessarily implying that a resolution to the situation is necessary or desirable.

Babrow's theory shares some common ideas with Uncertainty Management Theory (UMT), which was developed by Dale Brashers (2007, A theory of communication and uncertainty management. In B. Whaley & W. Samter (Eds.), Explaining communication theory (pp. 201–218). Mahwah, NJ: Lawrence Erlbaum). For a comparison of the perspectives, see Bradac (2001).

== Current usage ==
The complexity of PI and the multiplicity of its manifestations makes it difficult to operationalize, measure, and apply. However, this breadth of scope also indicates that it may have extremely wide-ranging applications and opportunities for research. Because the concepts within PI are based on cultural definitions, PI is seen as being overly responsive to external conceptual influences; thus, making it potentially falsifiable.

PI has been used extensively in analysis of the health care system, particularly in regard to communication between health care providers and patients. The health-care system inherently involves communication between health-care providers (e.g., doctors, nurses, various therapists, dietitians, social workers, counselors, etc.), patients, and members of the patient's social and support network (e.g., family members, friends, members of support groups, etc.). Because understanding and communicating diagnoses, prognoses, treatment plans, expectations, and more can be complicated and because this communication relies on the communication skills of the various people involved, health-care situations offer ample opportunity to examine problematic integration. Research in this area has revealed that information is used to decrease and increase uncertainty, depending on the situation. In some cases, patients may seek information to reduce stressful uncertainty. However, in other cases, the care team and the patient may need to increase uncertainty in order to increase optimism and allow for re-evaluation of a given situation. PI has been used to study communication involving various medical issues, including breast cancer, the treatment of diabetes in the elderly, end-of-life issues, and pregnancy.

Problematic Integration has also been used to evaluate organizational communication. Organizations, comprising networks and hierarchies of individuals, by their very nature, create complex webs of various dynamic social and cultural relationships. Moreover, most organizations do not exist for themselves, but for an external audience, client, or consumer; thereby increasing the nature, types, and numbers of relationships. Communication within these relationships will very likely give rise to instances of uncertainty. In the context of such complex systems of communication, PI takes on a much different appearance than intrapersonal situations. An organization's structure, system design, and strategy can create, maintain, or help reduce problematic integration.

One area of this study has been problematic integration arising from internal bureaucracy or organizational rules or objectives and how this conflict involves matters of formal rationality (a quantitative calculation of an action or choice) or substantive rationality (a value judgment of consequences of an action or choice).

In examining marketing strategies for tourism, PI has been used to suggest methods for decreasing uncertainty for potential customers and thereby increasing transactions from the on-line shoppers for the related retail businesses ("converting lookers to bookers").

As mentioned above, PI lends itself to application to a broad scope of issues. A few other examples of areas of interest to which PI has been applied include:

- Risk study and evaluation
- Family and relationships
- Narrative communication
- Mass media and media Studies (e.g., news reporting)
- Marketing and advertising
