= List of communications-related conferences =

This is a list of communications-related academic conferences. Most of these academic conferences are annual or bi-annual events.

== Discipline-wide conferences ==
- Association for Education in Journalism and Mass Communication
- International Communication Association
- National Communication Association

== Journalism ==
- Innovation Journalism

== Broadcasting ==
- Broadcast Education Association

== Public Opinion and Political Communication ==
- World Association for Public Opinion Research
- American Association for Public Opinion Research
- American Political Science Association
- Midwest Political Science Association

== Public Relations ==
- Institute for Public Relations

== Sociology ==
- American Sociological Association
- Midwest Sociological Society

== Psychology ==
- American Psychological Association

== Internet and New Media ==
- Association of Internet Researchers

== Media History and Law ==
- Social Science History Association
- Organization of American Historians
- American Journalism Historians Association
- Association for the Study of Law, Culture and the Humanities

== Popular culture ==
- Midwest Popular Culture Association

== Technology for Communication ==
- CommunicAsia
