= John Pollock =

John Pollock may refer to:

- John A. Pollock (businessman) (1936–2026), Canadian businessman, chancellor of Wilfrid Laurier University
- John D. Pollock (1926–1995), Scottish trade union leader
- John L. Pollock (1940–2009), American philosopher (epistemologist)
- John Pollock (author) (1924–2012), English Christian author, the official biographer of Billy Graham
- John Pollock (politician) (1893–1955), Scottish politician and trade unionist
- John Calvin Pollock (1857–1937), U.S. federal judge
- John A. Pollock (professor) (21st century), American neurobiologist
- John Donald Pollock (1868–1962), Scottish physician, industrialist and philanthropist
- John C. Pollock (born 1943), American social scientist and communication scholar
- Sir John Pollock, 4th Baronet (1878–1963), British historian, journalist and translator
- John Pollock (Missing), fictional character in the Canadian drama series, Missing
- John Pollock (journalist), Canadian combat sports journalist

== See also ==
- John C. Pollock House (built 1870), in Ohio, United States
- John Pollack (born c. 1965), American writer
