= Predicted outcome value theory =

Predicted outcome value theory introduced in 1996 by Michael Sunnafrank, posits that people seek information in initial interactions and relationships to determine the benefits of interpersonal relationships by predicting the value of future outcomes whether negative or positive. If a person predicts a positive outcome in the relationship this can lead to increased attraction, however if a person predicts a negative outcome then he or she would pursue limited interaction or possibly relationship termination. The processes of predicted outcome value directly link to continued relationship development and communication as well as stronger attraction and intimacy within the relationship.

Predicted outcome value theory proposes that initial interaction behaviors serve two related functions in individuals' attempts to maximize future relational outcomes. First, communication is directed at reducing uncertainty (Berger & Calabrese, 1975) about new acquaintances to determine likely outcome-values for the relational future. Second, communication proceeds in a manner predicted to result in the most positive outcomes. In a broad sense, these outcome value predictions would lead to communicative attempts to terminate or curtail the conversation, to continue the entry-level conversation, or to escalate the conversation and relationship beyond this level. Attempts to continue or escalate would result from positive predicted outcome values, while attempts to terminate or curtail would result from negative predictions. Given this, predicted outcome value theory proposes that several specific behaviors associated with conversational termination-escalation should be related to predicted outcome value levels. Among these, Sunnafrank (1986) posits that predicted outcome value is positively related to amount of verbal communication, intimacy level of communication content, nonverbal affiliative expressiveness, and liking.

== Key propositions of predicted outcome value theory ==
1. Attraction increases as the predicted outcome value increases
2. Prediction of positive future outcomes leads to future interactions
3. Prediction of negative future outcomes ends future interactions
4. People focus and discuss topics in conversations that facilitate positive predicted outcomes

== Related ==
Predicted outcome value theory is an alternative to uncertainty reduction theory, which Charles R. Berger and Richard J. Calabrese introduced in 1975. Uncertainty reduction theory states that the driving force in initial interactions is to collect information to predict attitudes and behaviors for future relationship development.

Sunnafrank challenges uncertainty reduction theory with his predicted outcome value theory in that initial interactions are not solely about reducing uncertainty within the relationship but motivated by the predicted outcome value. Sunnafrank ascertains that initial interactions only lead to continued relationship development after the person has determined future rewards and costs of that relationship.

However, when looking at the relationships of the implications of both theories, there are many parallels. The propositions set forth by predicted outcome value theory by Sunnafrank almost exactly mirror the eight axioms of Berger and Calabrese's uncertainty reduction theory.

When looking at predicted outcome value theory, there are positive and negative predicted outcome values (POV) that are produced based on initial interactions. When there are positive predicted outcome values, they align with all of the same positive implications of uncertainty reduction. In other words, when dealing with positive feelings after an initial interaction, the implications of how that initial interaction unfolded align with the axioms of uncertainty reduction theory. For example,

1. Verbal communication: There is a positive relationship between the amount of verbal communication and the predicted outcome value. If there is a positive POV between an initial interaction, both theories imply that verbal communication is most likely to increase. (This is the first axiom of uncertainty reduction theory and is the conclusion based on the second assumption of predicted outcome value theory.)
  Furthermore:
2. Proxemics: According to predicted outcome value theory, proximity in space and comfort of closeness increases more with higher POVs. (According to uncertainty reduction theory, as uncertainty reduces, the more we allow people to be comfortable in proxemics of space and display acts of affection, making this a negative relationship. As uncertainty decreases, acts of proxemics increase.)
3. Disclosure(-): We are willing to disclose increasingly personal information the higher the initial POVs are. (Similarly, as uncertainty reduces, the more we also feel comfortable opening up about ourselves.)
4. Reciprocity(+): The higher the initial POV, the more likely a person is to feel that they do not have to, or need to, reciprocate a conversation. (As uncertainty reduces, there is less of an urge to reciprocate a conversation. In other words, as uncertainty reduces, it is more likely that a person is willing to listen to a one-sided conversation and not feel obligated or need to reciprocate an answer.)
5. Similarity(-): The higher the initial POV, the more likely it is that people feel similar to one another. (As two people feel more similar to one another, uncertainty decreases.
6. Liking(-): The higher the initial POV, the higher probability is that a person likes the other, in terms of friendliness. (And as two people like each other increasingly more, uncertainty decreases accordingly.)
7. Shared networking(-): If two individuals have friends in common that they trust, the higher the initial POV is. (As a shared network of friends grows bigger and bigger, uncertainty decreases.)
  The only axiom that is disagreed upon the two, and is what differentiates the two based on their implications, is the idea of information-seeking.
8. Information-seeking- According to predicted outcome value theory, the higher the initial POVs, the more likely it is that the two people engaged in initial conversation will want to learn more about one another. And on the contrary, if the POV is negative (meaning that the initial interaction was not good), it is more likely that the two will not want to learn more about the other person. Thus, according to predicted outcome value theory, this is a positive relationship. The higher the POV, the more two people will want to know more about each other. On the other hand, according to uncertainty reduction theory, if there is high uncertainty between two people, it is more likely that they will want to know more about each other in order to reduce uncertainty, making this a negative relationship.

== Theory developer ==
Michael Sunnafrank is a professor in the Department of Communication, College of Liberal Arts at the University of Minnesota, Duluth. He joined the faculty at UMD in 1990 after fourteen years of teaching and research at Michigan State University, University of California Davis, Arizona State University and Texas A&M University. He was awarded his PhD and master's degrees by Michigan State University. Sunnafrank continues to work on research testing predicted outcome value theory.

== Empirical support ==
Sunnafrank's (1986) study examined a potential initial acquaintance association between perceived similarity and attraction may be present, though undetected, in previous interpersonal goals research and finds support for interpersonal goals claims regarding the perceived similarity/attraction relationship. The findings extended Sunnafrank (1983, 1984, 1985) and Sunnafrank and Miller's (1981) claim that attitude similarity and attraction are unassociated in beginning communicative relationships. While their research supports this claim for attitude similarity revealed in pre-acquaintance, it also shows that this claim generalizes to more normally occurring perceptions of attitude similarity produced during initial relational stages. The results strongly suggested that traditional beliefs about, and theoretical interpretations of, the attitude similarity/attraction association are incorrect, at least regarding the initial acquaintance period.

Another study, "Predicted Outcome Value in Initial Conversations", provided the initial test of several predicted outcome value theory (Sunnafrank, 1986) propositions. Findings supported all hypotheses tested, and demonstrated that during initial conversations predicted outcome value is strongly and positively related to the amount of verbal communication, intimacy of communication content, nonverbal affiliation, liking and perceived similarity.

More recent research was designed to investigate positive and negative predictors of possible relationships by focusing on decisions to engage in future dates. Interpersonal attraction, homophily, and nonverbal immediacy have been linked to the predicted outcome value of relationships during initial encounters. This study investigates how these variables influence date decisions in a six-minute speed-dating experience. Results indicated interpersonal attraction and nonverbal immediacy significantly predict predicted outcome value, but not future date decisions.

== Featured research and theory development ==
Michael Sunnafrank and Artemio Ramirez Jr., assistant professor of communication at Ohio State University, conducted research which was published in the Journal of Social and Personal Relationships in 2004 and also featured on ABC news. Sunnafrank and Ramirez studied 164 college freshmen over a nine-week period to determine the predicted outcome value of relationship development between strangers.

The study involved pairing two students of the same sex together the first day of class and introducing one another and then engaging in conversation for either three, six, or 10 minutes. Afterwards, researchers asked each student to predict the outcome of the relationship by describing it as a nodding acquaintance, casual acquaintance, acquaintance, close acquaintance, friend, and close friend. The students also completed extensive questionnaires about the other person to determine how much they liked one another (Sunnafrank & Ramirez, 2004).

Over the nine-week period, Sunnafrank and Ramirez (2004) facilitated a classroom environment that allowed the students to continue to get to know one another. At the end of the nine weeks, those students who predicted positive outcomes developed strong relationships and their behavior indicated such as those students sat together in class and communicated on a regular basis. The strongest effect of the study existed in the relationships where there was a predicted negative outcome. If students decided after the initial interaction that they did not want the relationship to progress then the students acted accordingly by restricting conversation, avoiding eye contact, and avoiding each other period.

Ramirez points out that there is power in first impressions. "People want to quickly determine if a person they just met is someone they are going to want to hang out with, or date, or spend more time with in the future. We don’t want to waste our time."

Sunnafrank says that college freshmen can be "aggressive" in pursuing new friendships and relationships within social circles and that behavior tends to change over time. "In most situations in life, our time is pretty much claimed by work and family matters, so even when you meet people you really like, chances are not much is going to happen. As life goes on and social networks become solidified, acting on that first impression becomes less likely."

Sunnafrank concluded that other events throughout the course of relationships can change the predicted outcome value, which he calls "surprising events", such as betraying one another's trust by "back stabbing" and that not all relationships turn out as originally predicted. However, in this study, it is apparent that initial impressions and interactions can determine the outcome of the relationship, which is the predicted outcome value theory. While the college freshmen had numerous opportunities to develop their relationships over the nine-week period, the first impressions made lasting impacts.

== Sources ==
- Griffin, E. A. (2005). A first look at communication theory with conversation (6th ed.). Boston, MA: McGraw Hill.
- Guerrero, L.K., Andersen, P.A. & Afifi, W.A. (2007). Close encounters: Communicating in relationships (2nd ed.). Thousand Oaks, CA: Sage Publications, Inc.
