= Narrative communication =

Narrative communication is a kind of a detached communication, where the person who is speaking is more involved in what he/she says rather than in the person who he/she is saying it to.

== Description ==
Narrative communication is a way of communicating through telling stories. Narratives can be defined as a symbolic representations of cohesive and coherent events with an identifiable structure, which are bounded in space and time and contain implicit or explicit messages about the topics being addressed. Most often, narratives are used to make sense of a past situation, express an opinion or belief, or teach cultural lessons. This use of narrative communication may be more persuasive and engaging than enumerating facts and statistics because narratives create an experience in which people can live through the storyteller's unique perspective.

== What is narrative communication? ==
The theory of narrative communication was developed by Walter Fischer. A narrative is an account of events over a passage of time shared to one or many listeners. More than a mere story, narratives encompass larger aspects. For example, a story is generally describing or recounting a noteworthy event in someone's life, whereas a narrative for example is not just the event but could describe multiple events to a whole sequence of someone in more detail than just telling one single story about the person.

Narrative Communication Theory has several baseline tenets, including:

1. Human beings are story-telling animals by nature, and stories are present in all cultures.
2. Stories are one of the main ways humans construct reality -- we understand our world through stories.
3. Stories are the primary way cultures teach members about important aspects of the culture, such as the group's values, beliefs, practices, and rituals..
4. Stories take different forms, including myths and parables.

== Usage ==
At a young age most people were taught to process and explain information by using narratives. They often used this theory to explain the events that have occurred throughout their day. This has allowed for peers to understand others lives through relationships, characters, and the retelling of outcomes from past decisions. with the innovation of technology it has made the usage of storytelling through social media easier when trying to communicate a certain objective.

== Personal ==
This concept explains that most of the narratives we use come from our personal experiences. When a friend or family member tells us about their day, and what has gone wrong to what is good, they are telling us how they want us to see them. History shows us that all cultures use some kind of narrative to form stories and dances to tell about their tribes and cultures. Same as family stories that are passed down from generation to generation. Those that are the recipients of these narratives experience transportation which is when they converge with the story by decreased their level of self-awareness while giving full attention to the narrative. They start to understand the narrative as more connected to their own lives, which leads them to focus more on the events that have occurred in the story they are being told. Narratives are also used in conflicts, they are used to make the arguments more personal and sympathetic so that the experiences relates easier with the other person.

== Professional ==
This facet of narrative states that professionalism at the work place provides many outlets to produce narratives that express who we are (Alder & Rodmen, 2009 ). In the professional world, we are exposed to different cultures and group norms that shape how we share our narratives. The usage of narratives can be used as a business strategy to build relationships and understand the underlying causes of issues. Narrative communication is also being used in the medical context (called narrative medicine) to help healthcare providers get a more holistic view of their patients' lives, values, and preferences, which can improve the provider-patient relationship and aid in medical decision making.

== See also ==
- Interpersonal communication
- Narrative paradigm
- Problematic integration theory
