= Health Communication (journal) =

- Discipline: Health communication
- Language: English
- Edited by: Teresa L. Thompson

Publication details
- History: 1989–present
- Publisher: Taylor & Francis
- Frequency: 8/year
- Impact factor: 2.9 (2025)

Standard abbreviations
- ISO 4: Health Commun.

Indexing
- CODEN: HECOER
- ISSN: 1041-0236 (print); 1532-7027 (web)
- LCCN: sf93091418
- OCLC no.: 18611352

Links
- Journal homepage; Online access; Online archive

Health Communication is a peer-reviewed academic journal covering health communication. It was established in 1989 and is published eight times per year by Taylor & Francis. The editor-in-chief is Teresa L. Thompson (University of Dayton). According to the Journal Citation Reports, the journal has a 2016 impact factor of 1.464, ranking it 26th out of 79 journals in the category "Communication" and 43rd out of 77 journals in the category "Health Policy & Services".
