= Decision downloading =

Communicating a decision to those not involved

Decision downloading refers to communicating a decision to those who have not been involved in the decision-making process.

The term “decision downloading” is used to set apart those special situations in which decision-makers communicate a decision that has already been made. It applies when the communicators cannot, for whatever reason, keep everyone informed in real-time about the decision-making process.

== Types of "downloaders" ==
Decision downloaders can be classified into three groups: robust, restricted, and remedial.

Robust downloaders discuss:

1. how the decision was made
2. why it was made
3. what alternatives were considered
4. how it fits in with the organizational mission
5. how it impacts the organization
6. how it impacts employees.

Restricted downloaders discuss some of the above issues, while remedial downloaders discuss few of them.

Robust decision downloaders have a different frame of reference than their less effective counterparts. They view themselves more as educators than cheerleaders. They recognize that education cannot be “once and done”. They know employees learn at different rates, in different ways and from different of sources

== Typical situations ==
- An executive team has been engaged in merger talks with another company. By mutual agreement, they cannot talk about the possible merger, even to employees. Presenting the offer to shareholders and other interested parties becomes a decision downloading situation.
- Union and management are locked into contentious negotiations that involve changes in compensation, work rules, and benefits packages. By agreed-upon rules, the offers and counteroffers are not openly discussed with union employees. After months of give-and-take, they agree on contract language and want to put it to a vote. Announcing the agreement becomes a decision downloading situation.
- An executive-level task force has been established with the principal objective of finding a creative way to reduce health care costs. After months of discussions with various vendors, they decide on an approach that minimizes the company health care expenses, preserves quality levels but involves modest increases in employee contribution levels. Announcing the plan becomes a decision downloading situation.

In each situation, the decisionmakers —either by choice or by prior agreement— do not involve others in the decision-making process. Discussions leading to the decision are often deep, nuanced and sometimes contentious. The decisions are frequently complex, often difficult to understand, and sometimes controversial. Simply put, the nature of the decision-making process and the features of the decision itself often make any subsequent communications about the decision extraordinarily difficult. Often, the subsequent communications are an afterthought borne out of psychological exhaustion from the decision-making process itself. Consequently, decision-makers frequently stumble through the “decision downloading process”. Researchers have found that only 50% of all decisions ever get implemented and sustained.

== Origin ==
The term was coined by Phillip G. Clampitt and M. Lee Williams in an article published in the MIT Sloan Management Review, Winter 2007.

== Causes ==
The causes of poor decision downloading include:

1. Failure to Clarify Responsibilities. Decision-makers sometimes fail to clarify who has responsibility for communicating the decision.
2. Desire to Quickly Inform. Decision-makers may restrict communication to the informational highlights because they are motivated by a desire to promptly inform everyone. They tend to focus on the results of the decision-making process, not on the relevant facts, the options weighed, the manner by which decisions were made, and the uncertainty surrounding conclusions.
3. Interest in Protecting Employees. Decision-makers may want to protect employees from all the nitty-gritty details of the decision-making process.

== Consequences of different styles ==
Researchers have reported that:

- Employees who experience robustly downloaded decisions are more than twice as likely to be supportive of the decision compared to those who are forced to cope with a remedially downloaded one.
- Robustly downloaded decisions engender greater employee job satisfaction, commitment to the organization, and identity with the organization than either of the other modes.
- Robustly downloaded decisions cultivate employee perceptions that the organization is well managed and headed in the right direction.

== Criticism ==
Since this is a relatively new concept there have not been replications of the original research.

== See also ==
- Communication studies
- Decision Making
- Decision making software
- Group Dynamics
- Interpersonal communication
- Organizational Communication
- Small-group communication
- Topic outline of communication
- Change management (people)
