= Public Health Film Festival =

The Public Health Film Festival (PHFF) was a film festival originally established by the Public Health Film Society (PHFS). The PHFF debuted in 2014, and took place every two years. PHFF specialised in screening films about health and was listed with the Internet Movie Database (IMDb).

The first three editions of the PHFF were hosted by The Oxford Research Centre for the Humanities (TORCH) at the Radcliffe Humanities Department in Oxford, England.

The theme for the 1st edition of the PHFF was "Public Health Past, Present and Future"; the 2nd, in 2016, was "Health For All"; the 3rd, in 2018, was "Growing Up Well"; the 4th, in 2020, was "Health and wellbeing in a pandemic: stories told through film"; the 5th, in 2022, was "Generation COVID: stories of public health told through film" and the 6th, in 2024, was "AI and Public Health".

The 2nd, 3rd, 4th, 5th and 6th editions of the PHFF hosted screenings of winning films from the International Public Health Film Competition.

The 3rd edition of the PHFF saw the introduction of an Audience Award, which was won by the film Lucy: Breaking the Silence from Fact Not Fiction Films.

From 2026 the PHFF and IPHFC was organised by Public Arts Health & Us (PAHUS). It was renamed to the Peekaboon International Film Festival (PIFF) & iDistribution Competition (iDC).
