= Public Health Film Society =

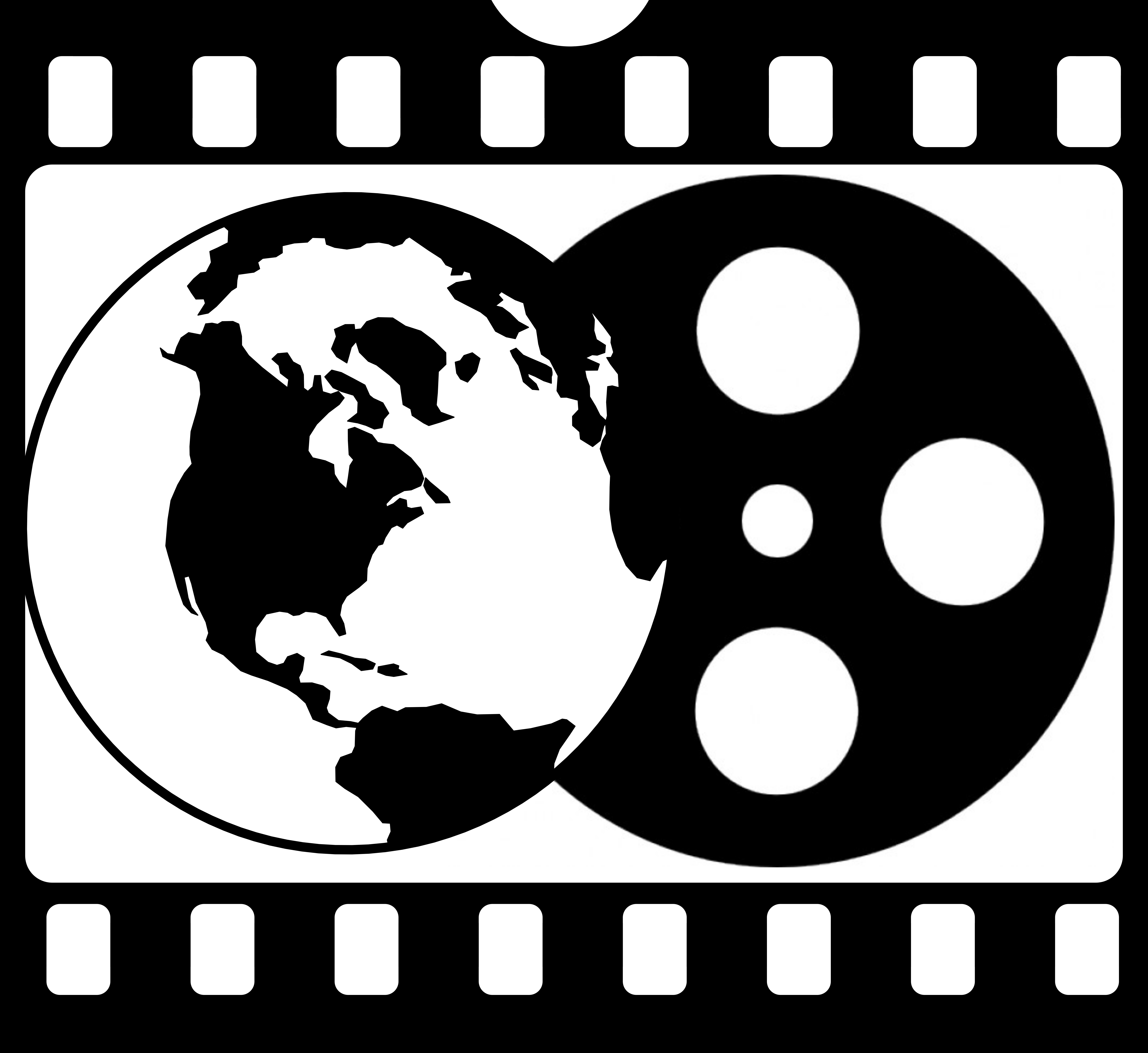
- Founded: 2014
- Dissolved: 2026
- Type: Charity
- Purpose: Films; Public health
- Headquarters: Oxford, England
- Origins: Oxford, England
- Region served: Worldwide
- President: Dr Uy Hoang
- Website: www.publichealthfilms.org

The Public Health Film Society (PHFS), was a charity registered in the UK (no. 1160590). It was established in 2014 by four public health specialist from Oxford - Dr Uy Hoang, Dr Olena Seminog, Dr Sam Williamson and Dr Stella Botchway, most of whom had been involved in the Oxford Public Health Film Club.

The charity was set up with the aim of 'bringing together people from many different backgrounds, to encourage them to share their knowledge, skills, and experience, and be inspired through the medium of film to understand public health, and work towards overcoming the public health challenges we all face'.

PHFS constitution was adopted in 2014 and it was registered with the Charity Commission in 2015.

The first president was Dr Stella Botchway (2014-2015). She oversaw the adoption of the constitution and the launch of the first ever Public Health Film Festival in the UK. She would later go on to become a researcher at The Oxford Research Centre in the Humanities (TORCH).

The second president was Dr Uy Hoang (2015–2026). He oversaw the 2nd and 3rd editions of the Public Health Film Festival and the launch of the International Public Health Film Competition. He is a health researcher currently at the University of Oxford.

In addition to helping to organise the Public Health Film Festival and the International Public Health Film Competition, the PHFS undertook a number of other works to promote conversations between the health and artistic communities about public health messages in film, and to promote transparency in the portray of health messages to the general public. This work included the distribution of correspondence and peer-reviewed research on health films. The PHFS was an affiliate member of the British Federation of Film Societies.

The PHFS was dissolved in 2026 and removed from the UK Register of charities in Feb 2026.
