= Health communication =

Health communication is the study and application of communicating promotional health information, such as in public health campaigns, health education, and between doctors and patients. The purpose of disseminating health information is to influence personal health choices by improving health literacy. Communication is a dynamic process, meaning that both the source and the receivers of shared information will constantly exchange roles. Health communication that is dynamic provides both caregivers and patients with a better chance of experiencing meaningful insights, leading to more positive health outcomes. However, how communication is received and processed is different for each individual, meaning that information and understanding that is derived from a conversation depends on each individuals prior experience, interpersonal relationships, cultural patterns, social norms and so on. Due to individual differences, connections can be built through strategies such as shared decision-making, motivational interviewing, and narrative medicine.

Because effective health communication must be tailored to the audience and the situation research into health communication seeks to refine communication strategies to inform people about ways to enhance health or avoid specific health risks. Academically, health communication is a discipline within the field of communication studies. The field of health communication has been growing and evolving in recent years. The field plays a crucial role in advancing health in collaboration with patients and medical professionals.Studies have established that patients often judge the quality of their physician's interpersonal effectiveness, or the physician's "bed-side manner," as a major indicator of general competence. Research shows health communication helps with behavioral change in humans and conveys specific policies and practices that can serve as alternatives to certain unhealthy behaviors. The health communication field is considered a multidisciplinary field of research theory that encourages actions, practices, and evidence that contribute to improving the healthcare field. The use of various skills and techniques to enhance change among patients and many others, and focus on behavioral and social changes to improve the public health outcome.

Health communication may variously seek to:

- increase audience knowledge and awareness of a health issue
- influence behaviors and attitudes toward a health issue
- demonstrate healthy practices
- demonstrate the benefits of behavior changes to public health outcomes
- advocate a position on a health issue or policy
- increase demand or support for health services
- argue against misconceptions about health
- improve patient-provider dialogue
- enhance effectiveness in health care teams

== Definition and origins ==
Health communication is an area of research that focuses on the scope and implications of meaningful expressions and messages in situations or circumstances associated with health and health care. Health communication is considered an interdisciplinary field of research, encompassing medical science, public health, and communication studies. Health Communication emphasizes more than the dissemination of facts, it involves the collaborative context of a shared understanding about health concepts and actions across different audiences. According to Communicating About Health: Current Issues and Perspectives, health communication includes, cultural, interpersonal, physical, social, organizational and political processes that shape how people experience health information and health decisions.

Health communication aims to increase knowledge by letting the public know what to do in a health crisis, be able to handle it smoothly and clearly without as much panic as when first discovering an illness or disease unknown to the public. Which research has shown that it can lead to behavioral change. It emphasizes that communication involves verbal and non-verbal messages between a sender and receiver. Effective communication informs health-related outcomes and situational analysis, which includes evaluating the audience to help guide the choice of appropriate messages and channels applied.

The origins of health communication can be traced to early medical and public health practices. In the 4th century BCE, the writings of the Greek physician Hippocrates highlighted connections between health, disease, and environmental factors. In the 18th century, British naval surgeon James Lind documented the causes and prevention of scurvy, contributing to early evidence-based health communication through medical publications Treatise of the Scurvy in 1753.

The term health communications was used in 1961 when the National Health Council organized a National Health Forum to discuss challenges faced in the communications of health information (Helen, 1962). The term was used again in 1962 when Surgeon General Luther Terry organized a conference on health communication to discuss how various techniques can make health information available to the public (US Department of Health Education and Welfare, 1963). The term was adopted by members of an interest group at ICA, International Communication Association in 1975. The research of health communication surrounds the development of effective messages about health, the dissemination of health-related information through broadcast, print, and electronic media, and the role of inter personal relationships in health communities. At the core of all of the communication is the idea of health and the emphasis of health. The goal of health communication research is to identify and provide better and more effective communication strategies that will improve the overall health of society. (Atkin & Silk, page 489)

== Research ==
Core Competencies of SACCIA Model for Safe Communication by Annegret Hannawa.

There are many purposes and reasons why health communication research is important and how it improves the healthcare field. The training programs of Health Care Professionals, or HCP, can be adapted and developed based on health communication research. (Atkin & Silk, 495) One major example of a specialized research program is the Health Communication Research Unit at the University of Witwatersrand in Johannesburg, South Africa, aimed at studying the challenges to heath communication faced by cultural diversity. Due to there being a diverse culture that makes up the group of patients within the health care field, communication to other cultures has been taught and has been made a focus in health care training classes. Research suggests that nonverbal and verbal communication between health care professionals and patient can lead to improved patient outcomes. According to Atkin and Silk on page 496 some health care facilities, like hospitals, are providing training and education materials for patients in order for them to have a better outcome due to better communication skills. Over the years, there has been much research done on health communication. For example, researchers want to know if people are more effectively motivated by a positive message versus a negative message. Researchers examine ideas like, are people better motivated by ideas of wealth and safety or an idea of illness and death. Researchers are examining which dimensions of persuasive incentives are most influential: physical health versus economic, versus psychological, versus moral, versus social. (Atkin & Silk, 497) Impact of the Health Campaign-After research has been conducted and analyzed on the effects of health communication, it can be concluded that a health communication campaign that is requiring a behavior change causes the desired behavior change in about 7%-10% or more in the people who are in the campaign site than those who are in the control group. Also, the effects are stronger for adoption of a new behavior than cessation of a current behavior, about 12% higher.

When evaluating the effectiveness of a health campaign, several factors are considered, including audience receptivity, the clarity and volume of the message, the communication channels used, and the broader communication context. Audience responsiveness may vary depending on the nature and framing of specific messages. The media channel and how the message is reached by the audience can affect the effectiveness of the health campaign. (Atkin & Silk, page 498)

== Training ==
Health communication professionals are specifically trained in methods and strategies for effective communication of public health messages, with qualifications in research, strategic development, and evaluating effectiveness. Health communication is taught in master's and doctoral programs. The Coalition for Health Communication maintains a list of such programs.

The International Association for Communication in Healthcare (EACH) is a global organization aimed at improving the health communication sector between practitioners and patients. One major program EACH offers is "tEACH". tEACH is a specific subgroup focused on aiding teachers across the globe with tools and resources for promoting proper healthcare communication. The program consists of training modules, organized conferences, as well as project support.

Scholars and practitioners in health communication are often trained in disciplines such as communication studies, sociology, psychology, public health, or medicine and then focus within their field on either health or communication. Practitioners are pragmatic and draw from social-scientific scholarship, theories from the humanities, and professional fields such as education, management, law and marketing (Maibach 2008). Professionals trained in health communication encounter a wide range of employment opportunities spanning between the public, private, and volunteer sectors and have the opportunity for a large amount of career mobility. Examples of jobs in each of these categories include federal, state, and local health departments in the public sector, Pharmaceutical companies and large corporations in the private sector, and various non-profit organizations such as the American Cancer Society and the American Heart Association in the volunteer sector.

== Overview ==
International Communication Association officially recognized health communication in 1975; in 1997, the American Public Health Association categorized health communication as a discipline of Public Health Education and Health Promotion.

Careers in the field of health communication range widely between the public, private, and volunteer sectors. Professionals of health communication are distinctively trained to conduct communication research, develop successful and repeatable campaigns for health promotion and advocacy, and to evaluate how effective these strategies have been for future campaigns.

Clear communication is essential to successful public health practice at every level of the ecological model: intrapersonal, interpersonal, group, organizational, and societal. In each instance of health communication, there must be careful deliberation concerning the appropriate channel for messages to best reach the target audience, ranging from face-to-face interactions to television, Internet, and other forms of mass media. The recent explosion of new Internet communication technologies, particularly through the development of health websites (such as MedlinePlus, Health finder, and WebMD), online support groups (such as the Association for Cancer Online Resources), web portals, tailored information systems, telehealth programs, electronic health records, social networking, and mobile devices (cell phones, PDAs, etc.) means that the potential media are ever changing.

The social and cultural contexts in which health communication occurs are also widely diverse and can include (but are not limited to) homes, schools, doctor's offices, and workplaces, and messages must consider the variant levels of health literacy and education of their audience, as well as demographics, values, socioeconomic issues, and many other factors that may influence effective communication.

During the COVID-19 pandemic, it became clear that major topics in health communication include misinformation as well as the role of communication in addressing health inequities. Misinformation had a major impact on vaccine acceptance and people's adoption of pandemic prevention measures. Not only does misinformation contribute to vaccine hesitancy, social discrimination and stigma, but is also affected by the ongoing global trust crisis in science and official sources. This further contributes to behavioral and social divides and to increasing long-standing inequities. A narrative shift is essential to address these issues.

=== Critical health communication ===
Critical health communication refers to scholarship that interrogates "how meanings and enactments of health are tied to issues of power through the systematic construction and maintenance of inequalities." It examines links with culture, resources, and other social structures. It is distinct from mainstream Health Communication in its emphasis on qualitative and interpretive methods, and its attention to the ideological processes that underpin shared understandings of health. Unlike much mainstream Health Communication, most Critical Health Communication holds that simply circulating better quality, or more visible message about health is not enough to meaningfully influence health outcomes or correct health care disparities. The first comprehensive review of Critical Health Communication was published in 2008, and since then the volume of Health Communication research taking a critical approach has steadily increased.

== Strategies and methods ==
Tailoring a health message is one strategy for persuasive health communication. For messages of health communication to reach selected audiences accurately and quickly, health communication professionals must assemble a collection of superior and audience appropriate information that target population segments. Understanding the audience for the information is critical to effective delivery.

Communication is an enigma that is detrimental to the healthcare world and to the resulting health of a patient. Communication is an activity that involves oral speech, voice, tone, nonverbal body language, listening and more. It is a process for a mutual understanding to come at hand during interpersonal connections. A patient's communication with their healthcare team and vice versa, affects the outcome of their health. Strong, clear, and positive relationships with physicians can chronically improve and increase the condition of a certain patient. Patients often find healthcare settings and professionals stressful. It is common for patients to withhold important information due to fears and embarrassment. Through two approaches, the biomedical model and the biopsychosocial model; this can be successfully achieved. Evidence has shown that communication and its traditions have altered throughout the years. With the use of many new discoveries and the changes within our technology market, communication has severely improved and become instantaneous.

Communicators need to continually synthesize knowledge from a range of other scholarly disciplines including marketing, psychology, and behavioral sciences. Once this information has been collected, professionals can choose from a variety of methods and strategies of communication that they believe would best convey their message. These methods include campaigns, entertainment advocacy, media advocacy, new technologies, and interpersonal communication.

=== Campaigns ===
A health campaign is an organization to change certain behaviors or show a different point of view on something in to persuade someone. Research shows how campaigns have effectively encouraged people to change an unhealthy health behavior that can potentially worsen their health. Health communication has been utilized to help address health conditions or habits contributing to adverse fatality-related effects. The Mediated campaign is the use of media to communicate with a broad audience and impart Knowledge or convince people of a particular point of view based on research that has contributed to the success of the behavior change campaign. A vast media campaign that includes bus signs, panel street signs, radio ads, television ads, and other advertisements with the primary objective of showing people a sign that includes the specific recommendation on fruit and vegetable consumption. Another method that was employed was calling random numbers to find out people's opinions regarding a balanced diet and regular exercise. "The percentage of respondents who considered walking to be very important increased." The recall's findings indicate that people's attitudes regarding walking and the eating of fruits and vegetables were generally more positive. The media has enhanced the campaign's attitude toward these two fundamental health-related behavioral changes. The results support that using media coverage can promote campaigns for healthy lifestyles.

Health Communication campaigns are arguably the most utilized and effective method for spreading public health messages, especially in endorsing disease prevention (e.g. cancer, HIV/AIDS) and in general health promotion and wellness (e.g. family planning, reproductive health). The Institute of Medicine argues that health communication campaigns tend to organize their message for a diverse audience in one of three ways:

- By catering to the common denominator within the audience
- By creating one central message and then later making systematic alterations in order to better reach a certain audience segment, while retaining the same central message
- By creating distinctly different messages for different audience segments

Both the Centers for Disease Control and Prevention and scholars of health communication emphasize the importance of strategic planning throughout a campaign. This includes a variety of steps to ensure a well-developed message is being communicated:

- Reviewing background information to define what the problem is and who is affected by the problem
- Setting communication objectives and proposing a plan to meet the wanted outcome
- Analyze the target audience by determining interests, attitudes, behaviors, benefits, and barriers
- Select channels and materials for communication in relation to what will most effectively reach audiences
- Develop and pretest message concepts to determine understanding, acceptance, and reaction to the message
- Implement communication with selected audience and monitor exposures and reactions to the message
- Ensure information is available in the language of intended audiences
- Assess the outcome and evaluate the effectiveness and impact of the campaign, noting if changes need to be made

==== Historical campaigns ====
2014 African Ebola Outbreak

In 2018, four years after the first major outbreak of Ebola in Western Africa, the Democratic Republic of Congo and UNICEF partnered together to raise awareness about the deadly virus in a multi-national effort reaching around 800,000 people in affected areas. Communication efforts about preventive measures and safe practices regarding the virus included home visits by nurses, campaigns in major cities and markets, and broadcasting through mass media.

China's 2019-2022 "Zero-COVID" Policy

Following the global outbreak of the COVID-19 pandemic in 2019, the Chinese government under General Secretary of the Chinese Communist Party Xi Jinping issued a major health communication campaign titled the "Zero-COVID" policy. This new set of restrictions included lockdowns, stricter contact-tracing mechanisms, and increased testing to Chinese citizens, aimed at attempting to stop the spread of COVID-19.

World Health Organization's (WHO) Heatwave Initiative

The WHO's "Heatwave and Health" initiative was launched in 2021 in co-partnership with the Pan American Health Organization aimed at educating the public in South and Central-American countries about the hazards present from heatwaves. Awareness including what to do before and during a heatwave was communicated in the form of webinars, information YouTube videos, and website articles. The campaign additionally focused on developing and/or strengthening local governments knowledge on the matter and establishing public safety plans when heatwaves are imminent.

==== COVID-19 In the United States ====
Four factors were important in controlling public panic in the United States following the discovery of the virus:

1. Being honest to the public, discussing current findings and what information is unknown.
2. Being persistent and specific to detail, making sure to let patients know the severity of the illness, even if not much information is known.
3. Provide confidence in decision-making, helping people become less fearful on experts' strategies.
4. Recognize concerned behavior among the public, reassure them, and give efficient explanations of new findings in a more compassionate way to avoid more panic across the country.

These variables have been shown not only to calm public outrage but also to encourage social change in behavior. Several health communicators and campaigns encourage this by suggesting taking action towards the surroundings of our community, involving hand sanitizers in consistently noticeable places like bathrooms, public parks, restaurants, etc. Health communicators explained that providing the pertinent information, including definitions of contagious illness, helps the public to better understand the severity of the virus and protocols to avoid spreading it. Preventing COVID-19 from spreading also requires persistent behavioral and attitude changes over time to regulate hygienic consistency towards the public.

Public health officials soon used similar, practical information on the appropriate use of hygiene to prevent the virus from expanding for good. This shifted them to the use of vaccines once established, providing another development that offered more concern on the needed numbers of vaccines to get rid of the contagious growth of the pandemic. New health communication crisis emerged as skepticism arose from the expedited manner in which the vaccine was created and approved. As the need for vaccines for COVID-19 increased, more questions arose from the public on whether the vaccine was trustworthy and skeptical about taking it, mainly due to its unusual speed of development.

==== Vaccine Hesitancy ====
Vaccines are a major influence in the health industry towards preventing illness, highlighting the need to communicate on why it is important to have one. A study conducted by the Strategic Advisory Group of Exerts on Immunization (SAGE) worked to see if vaccine hesitancy was determined by poor communication given to the public. They found that health communication did in fact play a role in making a significant difference on individuals getting or choosing to get vaccines to better impact their health. The research discovers that increase vaccinations involves a proper explanation and details on why vaccines are beneficial. In addition, there needs to be preparation beforehand on communication about what to expect.

Giving the public honest information through presentations, medical consensuses, pro-vaccine messages, and stating personal risks can improve behavioral change of the public towards vaccines. This was especially evident during the COVID-19 pandemic, which was the third leading cause in America.

==== The prevention of cigarette smoking ====
Cigarette prevention programs have been provided to students from grades 6 to 8, which decreases student smoking at grade school. The study found that there was a long-term effect when smoking prevention was combined with other factors in a particular channel that influenced the youth. However, the effects of smoking prevention varied. The Study's findings indicate that programs are implemented more effectively when they target youth through the media. The study involved two groups of students: one group received extensive media production through the school program, while the other only received the program for four years. The purpose of the program was to change the smoking behavior of the participants by emphasizing the benefits of quitting smoking, precisely the skill for refusing cigarettes and the perception for people their age not to smoke. A survey of the students was done at the end of the year, and it had a lasting effect on their perception of smoking. Furthermore, research demonstrates that widespread anti-tobacco media efforts in conjunction with other anti-tobacco control measures are associated with a decrease in smoking rates as well as an increase in the rate of smoking cessation. The study reveals, "the prevalence of smokers in the United States has declined over the past 40 years". The media campaign focuses on the success of smoking reduction. The campaign promotes the idea that people who are "exposed to the message have the motivation to seek additional information for quitting" and offers people who are attempting to quit the chance to be able to sustain self-restrain from smoking.

===== American smallpox epidemic =====
In 1721, health communication was used to mitigate the smallpox epidemic in Boston. Cotton Mather, a political leader, used pamphlets and speeches to promote inoculation of smallpox.

===== Alcohol abuse =====
Alcohol abuse has been a problem within society for about as long as alcohol has been around. In the 19th century, the Women's Christian Temperance Union led a movement against alcohol abuse. They utilized mass communication to communicate the desired message. Newspapers and magazines allowed for the promotion of the anti-alcohol movement.

===== Cardiovascular disease =====
Three-community study and the five-city project were experimental campaigns to inform middle-aged men about the causes of cardiovascular disease. Health messages were communicated via television, radio, newspaper, cookbooks, booklets, and bus cards. The three "communities" comprised three experimental communication strategies: a media-only campaign, a media campaign supplemented with face-to-face communication, and a no-intervention control group. The experimented revealed that after one year, the most informed at-risk men were those in the second experimental group: they men consumed the media campaign and were attended by a health care provider.

==== STD Prevention and Regulation ====
Many campaigns and studies involving STD prevention were reviewed to see what the most effective exposure and communication strategies were to stop the spread of Sexually Transmitted Diseases (STDs). All campaigns researched that were well-managed and structured had similar results in which individuals who were more exposed to STD prevention methods and communication had long-lasting effects on their target audience. These effects included having safer-sex discussions, reducing sex partners, and HIV testing. Constant delivery of STD prevention towards the campaign's intended research also led them to similarly provide a call-to-action to individuals to make sure they properly communicate on sex, have access to support, use condoms consistently, and, most importantly, get tested.

=== Communication channels ===
==== Entertainment media ====
Using the entertainment industry as a platform for advocating health information and education is a communication strategy that has become increasingly popular. The most utilized strategy is for health communication professionals to create partnerships with storyline creators so that public health information can be incorporated into within the plot of a television show. The Centers for Disease Control and Prevention has formed a strong partnership with Hollywood, Health, and Society, at the University of Southern California Norman Lear Center to continue to produce new storylines on television and in film studios that will help to promote public health information. Some of the resources provided with this partnership include comprehensive "tip sheets" to provide writers with easy to access and trustworthy information on health issues, and meetings and panels to discuss new information and resources. Some of the most notable examples of this method of communication in recent years have been with the films Contagion and I Am Legend in understanding the spread of disease, NBC's series Parenthood in Asperger's Syndrome, and with the CW's series 90210 and spreading cancer awareness. More recently, film festivals and competitions focused specifically on health films have been organized by the American Public Health Association, the International Health Film Festival, the Global Health Film Initiative of the Royal Society of Medicine and the Public Health Film Society.

Writers and storyline developers have an increased motivation to continue to incorporate public health information into their scripts with the creation of the Sentinel for Health Awards in 2000, which honors storylines that effectively promote health topics and audience awareness of public health issues. Surveys conducted by Porter Novelli in 2001 reported many interesting statistics on the effectiveness of this strategy, such as that over half of regular prime time and daytime drama viewers have reported that they have learned something about health promotion or disease prevention from a TV show. Amongst this data, minority groups are significantly represented with well over half of African American and Hispanic viewers stating that they had either taken some form of preventative action after hearing about a health issue on TV, or that a TV storyline helped them to provide vital health information to a friend or family member.

==== Direct marketing ====
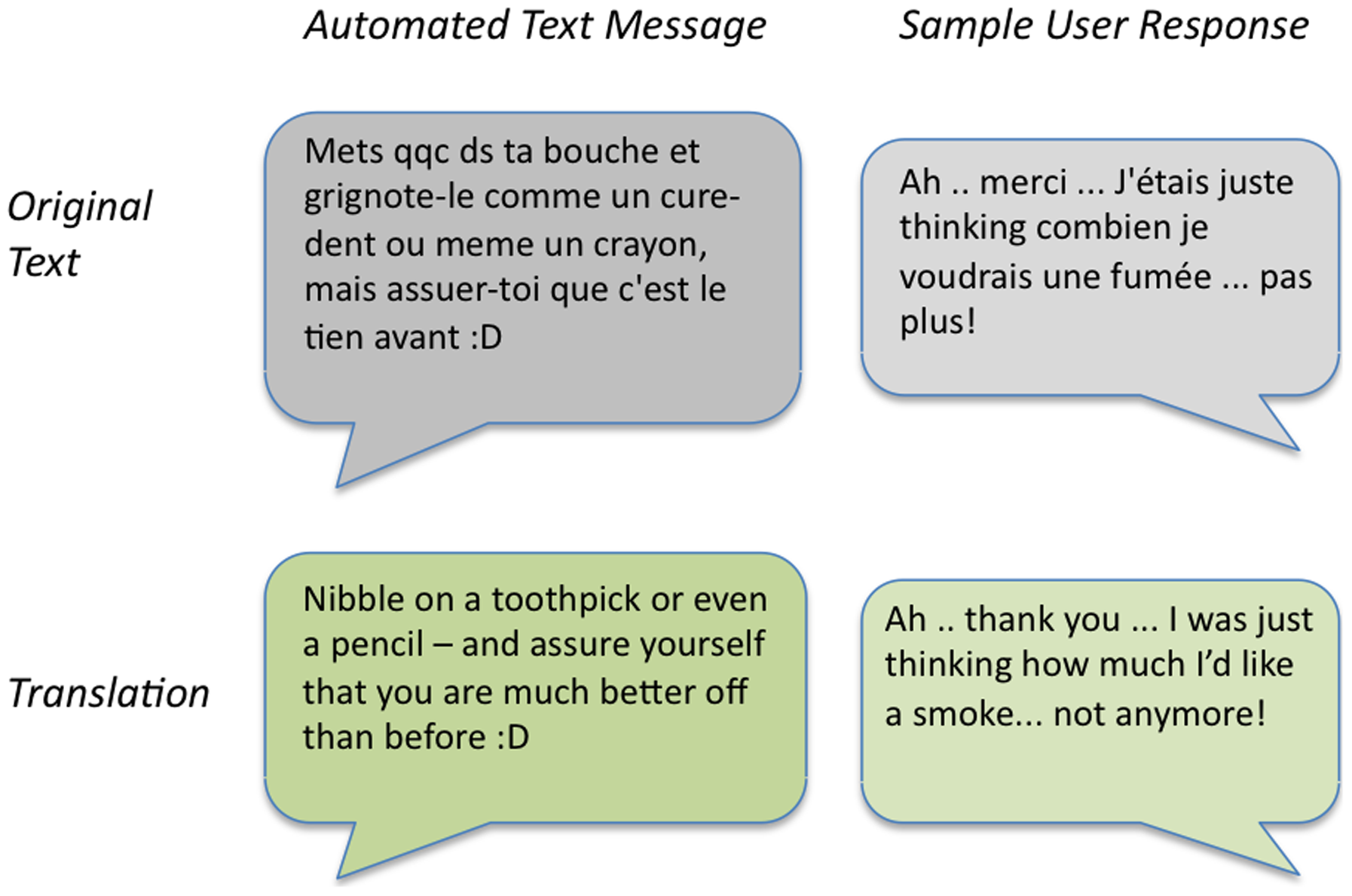
Some health organizations manage text messaging services to help people avoid smoking

Media advocacy use strategic mass media tools combined with widespread organization in order to advocate for healthy public policies or lifestyles. This can include the use of text messaging and email to spread messages from person to person, and using social networking venues to promote health information to a wide-ranging audience. As technologies expand, the platforms for health communication through media advocacy will undoubtedly expand as well.

==== Social media ====
Social media consists of websites and applications that enable users to create and share content including communication regarding health. As technology continues to evolve it expands the access to health information. Social media platforms allow for the distribution of health information in real time to millions of people. This instant communication has resulted in a dramatic increase of social media being used as a means to connect about health on a global level. In recent years the upward trend to use social media during disaster and crisis times to share public health concerns can be followed. Using social media to upload content about health communication can also result in the rapid spread of misinformation. Many of these platforms have implemented fact checking statements to assist in ensuring information shared is credible.

==== Interpersonal communication ====
Health communication relies on strong interpersonal communication in order to influence health decisions and behaviors. The most important of these relationships are the connection and interaction between an individual and their health care provider (e.g., physician, therapist, pharmacist) and an individual's social support system (family, friends, community). These connections can positively influence the individual's decision to make healthy choices. Patients are more prone to listen when they feel invested emotionally into the situation. If they feel as if they understand what is being said, they are more prone to make objective decisions based on the information heard. Two of the most prominent areas of study in interpersonal health communication are the patient-centered and the relationship-centred models of care.

== Types of interpersonal health communication model ==
=== Patient-centered model ===
The Patient-centered Model focuses on the patient's understanding from the patient perspective. Healthcare professionals pay close attention to patients' worries, feelings, and opinions. In the patient care-centered model, given that the patient participates in developing, planning, and overseeing their care, the healthcare provider views them as team members. It also shows how the healthcare team views the patient as a fellow member who can be helped to achieve a specific objective with a clear vision by exchanging information.

As patient-centered communication and connection are essential, interruptions in health communication are researched. Healthcare professionals are given guidelines to adhere to since interruptions could render the patient-centered model less effective. Research shows when a patient and a healthcare provider are conversing about care, the patient takes about two to three minutes to express what they want to talk about, especially when the provider asks a question that requires them to be clear and detailed (Naughton). The healthcare provider interrupts what the patient is saying after about 23 seconds on average. A study differentiated between interruptions that are cooperative and disruptive. It implies that interruptions don't necessarily have to be intrusive they can also be cooperative, which means that the interruptions can be constitutive and, thus, can result in a continuance of the conversion process, In the study 84 natural interactions between the physicians and Patient the primary goal of classifying the interruption as cooperative or intrusive was conducted. The results show that 82.9% of 2,405 interruptions were cooperative instead of intrusive. Overall, the patient-centered model seeks to minimize disruptions in general. Offering medical professionals training programs based on the patient-centered model of health communication demonstrates the emphasis on interruption, with the main practice suggestion being that physicians should avoid interrupting the patient early in the interview.

=== Relationship-centered model ===
Relationship-centered care is characterized by the contributions of teamwork and understanding made between the patients and the physicians and their respective perceptions of the value of their relationships. The patient-medical professional relationship continues to be crucial. For the patient to obtain relationship-based assistance, the clinical provider should involve the patient, family members, and other clinicians when making decisions under the relationship-centered care paradigm. While a relationship-based center developed to comprehend the patient, the relationship care center's methodology begins with implementing a patient care center that centralizes the patient. Relationship care encourages medical professionals to empathize with the patient. Relationship-centered care focuses more on empathizing with the patient due to their ability to Express their emotion. When the patient expresses their emotion, it helps both ways in terms of the health professional understanding the patient and serving the patient's needs. In the cognitive domain, medical professionals concentrate on the idea of the relationship center and emphasize providing medical information as well as patient education. Care involves mutual trust, respect, and acceptance in the emotional domain.

== Applications ==
Health communication has become essential in promoting the general public health in situations. One of health communication's most important applications has been throughout major environmental events (e.g. hurricanes, flooding, tornados). Health communication professionals are working to improve this type of risk communication in order to be prepared in the case of an emergency.

Another increasingly important application of health communication has been in reaching students in the college community. The National College Health Assessment has measured that 92.5% of college students reported being in "good, very good, or excellent health", however college students seem to battle serious problems with stress, depression, substance abuse, and a general lack of nutrition in comparison to other age groups and audiences. Professionals in health communication are actively striving for new ways to reach this at-risk audience in order to raise standards of public health in the college setting and to promote a healthier life style amongst students.

== Challenges ==
There are many challenges in communicating information about health to individuals. Some of the most essential issues have to do with the gap between individual health literacy and healthcare workers and institutions, as well as flaws in communicating health information through mass media.

Health communication is additionally influenced by cultural values which in some cases can create a barrier in effective health communication. When the sender and receiver are from contrasting socioeconomic backgrounds, of a different race, or even vastly different ages, effective health communication declines. This is a result of the fact that people tend to trust and be more open to ideas coming from someone similar to themselves.

=== Literacy-communication gap ===
One problem that health communication seeks to address is the gap that has formed between health literacy and the use of health communication. While the goal is that health communication will effectively lead to health literacy, issues such as the use of unexplained medical jargon, ill-formed messages, and often a general educational gap have created barriers to patient healthcare literacy. Specifically, studies have been done amongst elderly populations in America to illustrate a common audience who is left at a disadvantage due to this issue. The older adults comprise an age group that generally has the most chronic health conditions in comparison to other age groups, however studies have shown that this group has difficulty understanding written health materials, understanding health care and policies, and generally do not comprehend medical jargon. Such shortcomings of health communication may lead to increased hospitalizations, the inability to respond to and manage a disease or medical condition, and a generally declining health status.

To redress these problems, health communication professionals have recommended programs for improving physician communication with patients. One recommendation is to improve medical student training by adding lectures, workshops, and supervised encounters with patients to teach interpersonal and communication skills as a core competency. It is also recommended that practicing physicians improve their communication skills by attending webinars and on-site customized training programs. If physicians can improve their communication skills, they can ameliorate the problem of patient healthcare illiteracy and contribute to better patient adherence to medical advice.

In some populations, health-related websites (e.g., WebMD) and online support groups (e.g., Association for Cancer Online Resources) have increased access to health information. The role of language in communication, especially related to the patients' preferred language physicians use to communicate with them in, also plays a role. Results of a 2019 systematic review found that limited English proficient (LEP) patients have improved health outcomes when they receive care from physicians fluent in the patients' own preferred language. The National Institute for Health and Care Research (NIHR) has published review of research for providers of health information, on what happens when health information is not clear, how to help people understand health information, and which groups of the population may need extra support understanding health content. It covers research on using simple, balanced language, finding the correct focus, alternative formats (e.g. videos, visuals), and online information.

=== Mass media ===
Mass communication is used to promote beneficial changes in behavior among members of populations. A major criticism of the use of mass media as a method of health communication is the ability for false and misinformed messages to spread quickly through the mass media, before they have the chance to be disputed by professionals. This issue may generate unwarranted panic amongst those who receive the messages and be an issue as technology continues to advance. An example of this may be observed in the ongoing distrust of vaccinations due to the publication of numerous messages that wrongly link the childhood measles-mumps-rubella (MMR) vaccination with the development and onset of Autism. The speed with which this message spread due to new social networking technologies caused many parents to distrust vaccinations and therefore forgo having their children receive the vaccine. Although this panic is based on false information, many still harbor a lingering suspicion towards vaccinations and refuse them, which has caused a public health concern.

==== Psychological Reactance ====
Another challenge of health communication is that it fails sometimes and one of the reason is attributed to psychological reactance, Brehm (1966). It is a theory that posits that people are motivated to reject advocacy messages because such messages are likely to threaten their freedom to make decisions autonomously. Sometimes reactance leads to a boomerang effect that produces the direct opposite behavior in people, especially for health messages which are often persuasive and directive, they easily may appear to limit a person's choice. Reactance theory has been used to understand how health messages covering topics such as binge drinking, smoking, drug use, and fitness elicit reactance rather than compliance.

To reduce resistance to health messages, researchers propose the use of narratives instead of explanatory or fear-inducing messages because of its unique nature to create identification with characters and transport the audience along a story arc. Narrative advertising tends to generate more positive thoughts and feelings about the advertised product or brand compared to traditional argument or advocacy advertising which is the popular message design for health communication.

== Historical timeline ==
The following are some key events in the development of health communication as a formal discipline since the 1970s.

1975. International Communication Association establishes the Therapeutic Communication Interest Group (which later became the "Health Communication" Division)
1979. The American Academy on Physician and Patient (later renamed the American Academy on Communication in Healthcare) was established to promote research, education, and professional standards in patient-clinician communication.
1984. Health communication textbooks begin appearing: Kreps & Thornton (1984), Sharf (1984), and Northhouse & Northhouse (1985)
1985. National Communication Association forms the Commission for Health Communication, which later became the Health Communication Division
1989. First peer reviewed journal devoted to health communication, Health Communication. Followed in 1996 by the Journal of Health Communication
1995. Undergraduate and graduate health communication majors begin to be offered. Tufts University School of Medicine offers the first Master of Science in health communication together with Emerson College
1998. The Health Communication Working Group of the American Public Health Association was established to examine the role of health communication in public health promotion.
1999. The National Cancer Institute (National Institutes of Health) establishes the Health Communication and Informatics Research Branch (HCIRB) in their Behavioral Research Program, Division of Cancer Prevention and Control. The National Cancer Institute identifies health communication as an extraordinay research opportunity for promoting cancer prevention and control.
1999. The National Cancer Institute establishes the Health Communication Intervention research program, funding seven multi-year research projects to study innovative strategies for communicating cancer information to diverse populations.
1999. The Journal of Medical Internet Research is established to study health and health care in the Internet age.
2002. The National Cancer Institute establishes the Health Information National Trends Survey (HINTS) biennial representative national survey of consumer health information seeking, acquisition, and use to evaluate progress in cancer communication and to guide health communication intervention.
2003. The National Cancer Institute announced establishment of four national Centers of Excellent in Cancer Communication Research (CECCRs) providing five year funding for research centers at the University of Pennsylvania, University of Wisconsin, University of Michigan, and Saint Louis University. The CECCR program was designed to make major advances in health communication research and application, as well as to train the next generation of health communication scholars.
2004. The Centers for Disease Control and Prevention (CDC) establishes the National Center for Health Marketing (NCHM)for promoting and conducting health marketing and communication research to support national health promotion efforts.
2004. The Coalition for Health Communication (CHC) is established as an inter-organizational task force whose mission is to strengthen the identity and advance the field of health communication. CHC represents the ICA and NCA Health Communication Divisions and the APHA Health Communication Working Group.
2007. The first dedicated Ph.D. program in Health and Strategic Communication is offered by the George Mason University Department of Communication.
2008. The National Cancer Institute announced re-issuing of the national Centers of Excellent in Cancer Communication Research (CECCRs) program. They provided five years of funding for five research centers at the University of Pennsylvania, University of Wisconsin, University of Michigan, Washington University in St. Louis, and Kaiser Permanente, Colorado. The new CECCR program was designed to continue progress in advancing in health communication research and application, as well as to train the next generation of health communication scholars.
2009. First serious efforts put forth by Home Controls' HealthComm Systems to educate consumers regarding affordable, unobtrusive home technology allowing the aging to remain at home for months or years longer than ever before
2009. The Society for Participatory Medicine (SPM) is established to promote participatory medicine by and among patients, caregivers and their medical teams and to promote clinical transparency among patients and their physicians through the exchange of information, via conferences, as well through the distribution of correspondence and other written materials. The SPM publishes the Journal of Participatory Medicine.
2009. The Murrow Center for Media and Health Promotion is established at Washington State University.
2014. The Center for Health Communication is established in the Moody College of Communication at the University of Texas at Austin.
2014. The Public Health Film Society (PHFS), an independent charity is established to promote conversations between the health and artistic communities about public health messages in film, and to promote transparency in the portray of health messages to the general public through film festivals, international film competitions, as well through the distribution of correspondence and peer-reviewed research.

== The See also ==
- Advocacy
- Communication
- Community health
- Epidemiology
- Health education
- Health literacy
- Health promotion
- Healthy People program
- Medical social work
- Medical literature
- Medical writing
- Problematic integration theory
- Public Health
- Social marketing
