= CommunicAsia =

Technological exhibition and conference in Singapore

- Status: Active
- Genre: Information and communication technologies
- Venue: Marina Bay Sands
- Location: Singapore
- Country: Singapore
- Inaugurated: 1979
- Attendance: 55,000
- Organiser: Singapore Exhibition Services
- Website: http://communicasia.com

CommunicAsia is an information and communications technology (ICT) exhibition and conference held in Singapore. The annual event has taken place since 1979 and is usually held in June. The show customarily runs concurrently with the BroadcastAsia and EnterpriseIT exhibitions and conferences, all of which are operated by Singapore Exhibition Services.

== Overview ==
The CommunicAsia Exhibition is organized for the ICT industry in the Asia-Pacific region. It draws global industry brands to showcase key and emerging technologies. Past exhibitors include LG, Yahoo!, Huawei, Skype, Research in Motion (Blackberry), and Samsung. Attendance is restricted to trade professionals, but admission is free.

The CommunicAsia Summit includes roundtable discussions, forums, and presentations on a range of industry specific subjects. The summit draws participation from experts and managers from the telecommunications, service provider, and satellite sectors, as well as senior government functionaries and regulators.

== History ==
=== Prior to 2009 ===
From 1979 to 1999 the show was a biennial event. It was held at the World Trade Centre, Singapore, from 1979 up until it moved to Suntec for the 1996 and 1998 shows. In 1999 CommunicAsia was held at Singapore Expo, where it continued to be hosted up until 2010. It was cancelled in 2003 due to an outbreak of SARS.

=== 2009 ===
CommunicAsia 2009 ran from 16 – 19 June 2009 and the tradeshow featured 1,923 exhibiting companies from 60 countries and regions. The event attracted a total of 54,354 visitors from 100 countries spanning Asia-Pacific, Europe, US and the Middle-East.

Significant announcements at the event included the launch of two new smartphones by Huawei – the Android-powered U8230 and the C8000, running the Windows Mobile operating system. LG also unveiled its Crystal GD900, the world's first transparent phone, while Samsung introduced its next era of smartphones in a worldwide launch. Garmin and ASUS also announced a first ever collaboration, the Garmin-ASUS nuvifones G60 and M20, smartphones with location-based capabilities.

The CommunicAsia 2009 Summit attracted 700 delegates and covered topics such as Mobile Services and Business Models, Network Enablers and Architectures, Satellite Communications Forum, Green Telecoms, Mobile Marketing and Advertising, Mobile TV and Entertainment, IPTV and Next Generation Broadband.

=== 2010 ===
Held from 15 to 18 June at the Singapore Expo, CommunicAsia 2010 attracted over 55,000 industry visitors, conference speakers and delegates. 55% of visitors came from overseas, mostly from Indonesia, Malaysia and Thailand.

Announcements made at CommunicAsia 2010 included the launch of the Alcatel One Touch Net mobile by Yahoo! and Skype announcing the availability of its interface on three Sony Ericsson Symbian-based smartphones. Other announcements made at the event included the unveiling by Samsung of the Wave and Wave Pro.

It is estimated that deals worth over of $US3.6 billion were signed at the tradeshow.

The CommunicAsia Summit drew 650 participants and discussed topics including Mobile Value Added Services, Network Security, Getting in on the Cloud, Converged Device Management, Mobile Marketing & Profitability and New Revenue Opportunities. The keynote address was delivered by Josh Silverman, CEO of Skype.

=== 2011 ===
The 2011 exhibition and conference was held from 21 to 24 June at Marina Bay Sands and closed with strong results.

=== 2012 ===
CommunicAsia2012 was held at Marina Bay Sands from 19 to 22 June 2012.

Over 200 debut exhibitors such as AMOS-Spacecom, Calix Networks, Integrasco, Mentum, NovelSat, SLA Mobile and Yokogawa Engineering Asia, shared their expertise and launch their latest products and solutions at the show.

EnterpriseIT, held in conjunction with CommunicAsia, showcased exhibitors comprising international IT systems providers and companies offering enterprise solutions including cloud computing, data centre services, security and M2M software, and mobility solutions and video conferencing.

The show included product launches from Huawei, Panasonic, and Blackmagic Design, among others.

The event saw Asia's largest satellite representation in a technology trade event, as well as conferences and meetings with over 350 experts. The show closed on 22 June 2012.

=== 2013 ===
CommunicAsia2013 was held from 18 to 21 June 2013 at Marina Bay Sands.

=== 2014 ===
CommunicAsia 2014 was held from 17 to 20 June 2014 at Marina Bay Sands.

=== 2017 ===
CommunicAsia 2017 was held from 23 to 25 May 2017 at Marina Bay Sands.
