= Midwest Popular Culture Association =

The Midwest Popular Culture Association (MPCA) is a regional branch of the Popular Culture Association, a group of scholars and enthusiasts who study popular culture. The organization held its first conference in Duluth, Minnesota in 1973. After a five-year hiatus during the 1990s, the organization met in Milwaukee, Wisconsin in 2002.

MPCA usually holds its annual conference in a large city in the Midwestern United States. In the last several years, meetings have been held in Minnesota, Ohio, Missouri, Indiana, Michigan, Wisconsin, and Illinois, typically in October.

Anyone may join and submit proposals for consideration at the MPCA conference; most presentations are university professors and students.

Membership in MPCA/ACA is not limited by geographical location, and presenters have come from Florida, California, Norway, and Australia.
