= John C. Pollock =

American social scientist (born 1943)

John Crothers Pollock (born January 26, 1943) is a US social scientist and communication scholar specializing in health communication, public health, human rights, and community structure theory. He is currently a professor in the department of communication studies and a faculty affiliate in public health at The College of New Jersey, where he has taught since 1992. He was educated at Swarthmore College, the Maxwell School of Citizenship and Public Affairs (Syracuse University), the Johns Hopkins School of Advanced International Studies, and Stanford University.

== Community structure theory ==
=== Key contributions ===
Pollock’s first book outlining a “community structure approach”, Tilted Mirrors: Media Alignment with Political and Social Change – A Community Structure Approach], was published by Hampton Press in 2007. In that book, using a US multi-city comparative framework, Pollock outlined systematic patterns that link demographic characteristics of communities with variations in media coverage of critical issues. Articulating a “bottom-up” perspective on the formation of content of local media and public opinion, Pollock used community structure theory to challenge a prevailing, established mass media theory, “agenda-setting”, a “top-down” perspective suggesting that the content of both local media and public opinion is essentially “set” by what is reported in leading national media, in particular newspapers. A subsequent empirical study by one of the “fathers” of agenda setting, Maxwell McCombs and a co-author systematically compared the relative influence of both community structure theory and agenda-setting theory and found that community structure theory offers robust explanatory power in accounting for variations in coverage of critical issues in the US.

In 2011, Pollock furthered the development of community structure theory by collecting innovative scholarship in that tradition in a special issue of “Mass Communication and Society” (volume 14, issue 6), subsequently issued as a book edited by Pollock in 2013, Media and Social Inequality: Innovations in Community Structure Research, published by Routledge. After documenting the value of community structure theory in empirical studies in the US, Pollock combined both US multi-city and the first cross-national studies using community structure theory in a special issue of the “Atlantic Journal of Communication” (volume 22, issues 3-4, July-October 2014), subsequently issued as an edited book in 2015.

Pollock and coauthors made four key contributions to community structure theory. First, they conducted among the first US nationwide and cross-national studies using the community structure model, comparing multiple large metropolitan areas and countries, expanding study sample sizes beyond a focus on one or two cities. Second, Pollock and co-authors isolated three major umbrella “hypotheses” or “patterns” connecting community structure and variations in reporting on social change: a) The “buffer” hypothesis expects that higher proportions of privileged groups in communities would be linked with reporting relatively appreciative of human rights claims; b) the “vulnerability” hypothesis expects that reporting on social change will reflect the interests of society’s most “vulnerable” elements (the poor, the unemployed, the uninsured, single-parent families, etc.); and c) the “stakeholder” hypothesis expects that reporting on social change will reflect the interests of particular issue stakeholders, defined in terms of ethnic identity, political party identity, belief system, generation, or position in the family lifecycle.

Third, Pollock also made community structure theory more sophisticated by including a Media Vector methodological tool for coding both content direction and editorial prominence of articles, then combining them into a single score, thereby introducing a composite measure of both editorial evaluation and article content. Fourth, Pollock and coauthor findings often challenged the traditional “guard dog” hypothesis by uncovering patterns revealing that media can often reflect the interests of more vulnerable stakeholders. In 2008, Pollock authored the entry on the "Community Structure model" for the International Encyclopedia of Communication], and in 2013, he authored an authoritative annotated bibliography.
