= Uncertainty reduction theory =

Postpositivist communication theory developed in 1975

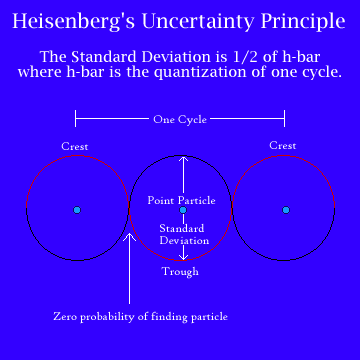
A graphical representation of Heisenberg's Uncertainty Principle.

The uncertainty reduction theory (URT), also known as initial interaction theory, developed in 1975 by Charles Berger and Richard Calabrese, is a communication theory from the post-positivist tradition.

It is one of the few communication theories that specifically looks into the initial interaction between people prior to the actual communication process. Uncertainty reduction theory originators' main goal when constructing it was to explain how communication is used to reduce uncertainty between strangers during a first interaction. Berger explains uncertainty reduction theory as an "increased knowledge of what kind of person another is, which provides an improved forecast of how a future interaction will turn out". Uncertainty reduction theory claims that everyone activates two processes in order to reduce uncertainty. The first being a proactive process, which focuses on what someone might do. The second being a retroactive process, which focuses on how people understand what another does or says. This theory's main claim is that people must receive information about another party in order to reduce their uncertainty and, that people want to do so. While uncertainty reduction theory claims that communication will lead to reduced uncertainty, this is not always the case. Dr. Dale E. Brashers of the University of Illinois argues that in some scenarios, more communication may lead to greater uncertainty.

Berger and Calabrese explain the connection between their central concept of uncertainty and seven key variables of relationship development with a series of axioms and deduce a series of theorems accordingly. Within the theory two types of uncertainty are identified: cognitive uncertainty and behavioral uncertainty. There are three types of strategies which people may use to seek information about someone: passive, active, and interactive. Furthermore, the initial interaction of strangers can be broken down into individual stages—the entry stage, the personal stage, and the exit stage. According to the theory, people find uncertainty in interpersonal relationships unpleasant and are motivated to reduce it through interpersonal communication.

== History ==
The foundation of the uncertainty reduction theory stems from the information theory, originated by Claude E. Shannon and Warren Weaver. Shannon and Weaver suggests, when people interact initially, uncertainties exist especially when the probability for alternatives in a situation is high and the probability of them occurring is equally high. They assume uncertainty is reduced when the amount of alternatives is limited and/or the alternatives chosen tend to be repetitive.

In 1975, Berger and Calabrese created uncertainty reduction theory "to explain how communication is used to reduce uncertainties between strangers engaging in their first conversation together". Previous researchers had approached interpersonal communication from empirical perspectives. Hypotheses had been derived from social psychological theories as well. However, the lack of focus on interpersonal communication process motivated Berger and Calabrese to form hypotheses that directly involve communication behavior.

Further research expanded uncertainty reduction theory's explanatory power in areas such as verbal communication, nonverbal communication, intimacy, reciprocity, and information seeking, etc. Scholars suggest that people should use a "variety of sources when collecting information to reduce their uncertainty." The variety of sources should include the words being expressed (verbal communication) as well as the physical mannerisms coupled with those expressions (nonverbal communication).

Brashers helped to further expand the scope of uncertainty reduction theory outside the traditional dyadic interpersonal exchange. Now, when scholars talk about uncertainty reduction, they tend to take humanity's discomfort with uncertainty as a basic tenet of what it means to be human.

== Assumptions ==
There are seven assumptions associated with the uncertainty reduction theory:

- People experience uncertainty in interpersonal settings.
- Uncertainty is an aversive state, generating cognitive stress.
- When strangers meet, their primary concern is to reduce their uncertainty or to increase predictability.
- Interpersonal communication is a developmental process that occurs through stages.
- Interpersonal communication is the primary means of uncertainty reduction.
- The quantity and nature of information that people share can change through time.
- It is possible to predict people's behavior in a lawlike fashion.

== Types of uncertainty ==
=== Cognitive uncertainty ===
According to the theory, people can have cognitive and behavioral uncertainty. Both of these might occur when two people meet for the first time.

Cognitive uncertainty is the uncertainty about other persons' beliefs and thoughts. It pertains to the level of uncertainty associated with the cognition (beliefs and attitudes) of each other in the situation. Uncertainty is high in initial interactions because individuals are not aware of the beliefs and attitude of the other party. An example of this is someone could have doubts about why another person acts a specific way, and then as a consequence, some questions may arise that could make a person feel uncertain. an example of cognitive uncertainty would be not knowing if a joke would deem funny or inappropriate to the other so you are uncertain if you should make that joke.

=== Behavioral uncertainty ===
Behavioral uncertainty is the uncertainty about other persons' actions. It pertains to "the extent to which behavior is predictable in a given situation". Uncertainty is one motivation behind adoption of norms in most societies in which people tend to abide by, and if in initial conversations one chooses to ignore such norms there are risks of increasing behavioral uncertainty and reducing the likelihood of having future interactions. A great example of ignoring societal norms is engaging in inappropriate self-disclosure.

== Reasons to reduce uncertainty ==
Berger suggests that an individual will tend to actively pursue the reduction of uncertainty in an interaction if any of the three conditions are verified. According to the theory, any single factor or all three of them combined can result in an increase in one's desire to reduce uncertainty in interpersonal interactions. These motives deal with decreasing uncertainty with strangers, relationships, and overall uncertainty within interactions.

- Anticipation of future interaction: A future meeting is a certainty.
- Incentive value: They have or control something we want.
- Deviance: They act in a manner that is departing from accepted standards

Example: For a couple of weeks there will be a new manager in your workplace, therefore future interactions with this person is a certainty. The manager is assigning projects to the people in your department, every project returns a different commission which will directly influence your income. Arguably, being assigned a higher paying project has a greater incentive value for anyone in the department. The manager has a sibling in your department, which could influence the manager's decision on project assignments.

== Stages of relational development ==
Berger and Calabrese separate the initial interaction of strangers into three stages: the entry stage, the personal stage, and the exit stage. Each stage includes interactional behaviors that serve as indicators of liking and disliking. Understanding the cycle of relational development is key to studying how people seek to reduce uncertainty about others.

- The entry stage: the entry stage of relational development is characterized by the use of behavioral norms. Meaning individuals begin interactions under the guidance of implicit and explicit rules and norms, such as pleasantly greeting someone or laughing at ones innocent jokes. Individuals use similar scripts to obtain basic information about the other person. The contents of the exchanges are often dependent on cultural norms. The level of involvement will increase as the strangers move into the second stage.
- The personal stage: the personal phase occurs when strangers begin to explore one another's attitudes and beliefs. Individuals typically enter this stage after they have had several entry stage interactions with a stranger. One will probe the other for indications of their values, morals and personal issues. Emotional involvement tends to increase as disclosure increases.
- The exit stage: in the exit phase, the former strangers decide whether they want to continue to develop a relationship. If there is no mutual liking, either can choose not to pursue a relationship.

Example: Rob Grace and Jason Chew Kit Tham discussed the three stages of crisis communication during the COVID-19 pandemic in the article Adapting Uncertainty Reduction Theory for Crisis Communication: Guidelines for Technical Communicators. In the first stage, city officials increased "the frequency of crisis communication, explaining recent events over five news conferences held during the week, and providing resources for citizens seeking information." In the second stage, the officials "recognized citizens' needs and experiences by adding a FAQs section and COVID-19 Dashboard to the city's website and by fielding citizens' questions during eight news conferences and city council sessions." In the last stage, the officials "broadcast two news conferences and explained the roles that state and local officials would assume during the phased reopening."

== Strategies for reducing uncertainty ==
People engage in passive, active, or interactive strategies to reduce uncertainty with others. Based on the overall uncertainty reduction theory, people should retrieve general demographic information about other people to reduce the level of uncertainty that they have about people's behavior. Strategies as seeking information, focusing on primary goals, contingency planning, plan adaptation, accretive planning, and framing are often utilized by human communicators.

These strategies are meaningful to communication studies in a way that people's "unique capacities for forethought and planning and their ability to monitor carefully ongoing communication episodes" is valued in communicative process.

- Passive strategy: according to Berger, If a person were to observe another in their natural environment, intentionally unnoticeable, to gain information on another, would be categorized as using a passive tactic for reducing uncertainties. Observing a person interacting with another resulting in less uncertainty. For example, watching someone in class, cafeteria, or any common area without attracting attention.
- Active strategy: an active strategist would result to means of reducing uncertainties without any personal direct contact. Asking another person or people about the individual you are trying to reduce uncertainty about. For example, if one were to ask a friend about a particular person, or ask the particular person's friend for some information without actually confronting the person directly.
- Interactive strategy: an interactive strategist would directly confront the individual and engage in some form of dialog to reduce the uncertainties between the two. Direct contact. For example, if one goes up to the person of said uncertainty and asking them directly.
- Extractive information seeking: A new strategy for reducing uncertainty was suggested in 2002 by Ramirez, Walther, Burgoon, and Sunnafrank that complements computer mediated communication and the technological advancements. Given the vast amount of information one could find about an individual via online resources a fourth uncertainty reduction strategy that uses online mediums to obtain information was labeled as extractive information seeking. For example, using a social media platform such as Facebook or Instagram as a tool to research personal information about said person.

== Axioms and theorems ==
Berger and Calabrese propose a series of axioms drawn from previous research and common sense to explain the connection between their central concept of uncertainty and seven key variables of relationship development: verbal communication, nonverbal communication, information seeking, intimacy level, reciprocity, similarity, and liking. The uncertainty reduction theory uses scientific methodology and deductive reasoning to reach conclusions. Axioms are statements without proof, but which are generally accepted. Axioms are self evident truths that require no additional proof. "Axioms are statements or propositions of a relationship between variables that are assumed to be true "(Blalock, 1969) It can also be additionally used to start a discussion and it is expected that because of different axioms, the level of uncertainty reduces overall. This part of uncertainty reduction theory demonstrates the positivistic approach Berger and Calabrese took. The approach "advocates the methods of the natural sciences, with the goal of constructing general laws governing human interactions".

=== Axioms ===
- Axiom 1: Verbal communication: Given the high level of uncertainty present at the onset of the entry phase, as the amount of verbal communication between strangers increases, the level of uncertainty for each interactant in the relationship will decrease. As uncertainty is further reduced, the amount of verbal communication will increase. With the uncertainty diminishing, the communication among the two people will not only increase but the conversation will become much more interesting as the individuals get to know each other more. In more recently published work by Berger, he states the importance of appropriate levels of verbal communication, where too much verbal communication may lead to information seeking by the other party.
- Axiom 2: Non-verbal affiliative expressiveness/warmth: Non-verbal affiliative expressiveness includes eye contact, head nods, arm gestures and physical distance between the interactants (closeness). As non-verbal affiliate expressiveness increases, uncertainty levels will decrease in an initial interaction situation. In addition, decreases in uncertainty level will cause increases in non-verbal affiliative expressiveness
- Axiom 3: Information seeking: In initial interactions, interactants are expected to engage in question asking, and the questions asked might only demand relatively short answers, for example: request for information of one's occupation, hometown, places of prior residence and so on. If one of the interactants still has a high level of uncertainty, it will be more than likely that other interactants will share very limited sensitive or personal information. High levels of uncertainty cause increases in information-seeking behavior. As uncertainty levels decline, information-seeking behavior declines
- Axiom 4: Intimacy level of communication content: High levels of uncertainty in a relationship cause decreases in the intimacy level of communication content. Low levels of uncertainty produce high levels of intimacy. For example, during initial interaction, the communication content are expected to be of low intimacy level such as demographic information, rather than content of high intimacy level such as attitudes and opinions.
- Axiom 5: Reciprocity: Reciprocity is concerned with the overall degree to which interactants expect another person to share similar information if one has shared something. High levels of uncertainty produce high rates of reciprocity. Low levels of uncertainty produce low rates of reciprocity. Berger and Calabrese assume that the easiest way to reduce mutual uncertainty would be to ask for and give the same kinds of information at the same rate of exchange and that as uncertainty is reduced, there is less need for symmetric exchanges of information at a rapid rate.
- Axiom 6: Similarity: Similarities between persons reduce uncertainty, while dissimilarities produce increases in uncertainty Dissimilarity between persons increased uncertainty because the number of alternative explanations for behavior also increases. Sharing similar interests can be related to many subjects, including personal matters such as opinions.
- Axiom 7: Liking: Increases in uncertainty level produce decreases in liking; decreases in uncertainty produce increases in liking. A number of theorists have presented supportive evidence that there is a positive relationship between similarity and liking. It is believed that if participants of a conversation have positive feelings about each other, the overall level of uncertainty will be much lower, and the number of conversations between individuals increases mightily. In the view of Axiom 6, the tendency that people seek out similar others in order to reduce uncertainty should tend to produce liking.

Based on further research two additional axioms were added to the theory, the 8th axiom was added by Berger and Gudykunst (1991) and the 9th axiom was suggested by Neuliep and Grohskopf (2000):

- Axiom 8: Shared Networks: Shared communication networks reduce uncertainty, while lack of shared networks increases uncertainty. This axiom is based on further research done by Berger and William B. Gudykunst (1991) which pertained to relationship beyond the entry stage.
- Axiom 9: Communication satisfaction: There is an inverse relationship between uncertainty and communication satisfaction. Communication satisfaction is defined as "an affective response to the accomplishment of communication goals and expectations". Suggested by James Neuliep and Erica Grohskopf (2000), this is an important axiom because it relates uncertainty to a specific communication outcome variable.

Kathy Kellerman and Rodney Reynolds examined factors that motivate people to reduce uncertainty: deviance and incentive value of the target. On the basis of their study, they suggested adding two more axioms:

- Axiom: As the target's behavior becomes more deviant, the level of uncertainty increases.
- Axiom: The greater the incentive values of the target, the lower a person's level of uncertainty.

Scholars create more additional axioms as the theory expands to other areas. For example, Theodore Avtgis's findings in a study of married couples could be considered as an axiom: "...as uncertainty between spouses decreases, reports of emotional and social support increase."

Combining axioms allows for the production of comprehension in relationships.

==== Table 2: Axioms of Uncertainty Reduction ====
Axiom	Main Concept	Relationship	Related Concept
1.	↑ Uncertainty	Negative	↓ Verbal Communication
2.	↑ Uncertainty	Negative	↓ Nonverbal Affiliative Expressiveness
3.	↑ Uncertainty	Positive	↑ Information Seeking
4.	↑ Uncertainty	Negative	↓ Intimacy Level of Communication
5.	↑ Uncertainty	Positive	↑ Reciprocity
6.	↓ Uncertainty	Negative	↑ Similarity
7.	↑ Uncertainty	Negative	↓ Liking

=== Theorems ===
Berger and Calabrese formulated the following theorems deductively from their original seven axioms:

- Verbal communication is positively related with nonverbal affiliative expressiveness, intimacy level, similarity, and liking, while it is negatively related with information seeking, and reciprocity.
- Nonverbal affiliative expressiveness is positively related with verbal communication, intimacy level, similarity, and liking, while it is negatively related with information seeking, and reciprocity.
- Information seeking is positively related with reciprocity, while it is negatively related with verbal communication, nonverbal affiliative expressiveness, intimacy level, similarity, and liking.
- Intimacy level is positively related with verbal communication, nonverbal affiliative expressiveness, similarity, and liking, while it is negatively related with information seeking, and reciprocity.
- Reciprocity is positively related with information seeking, while it is negatively related with verbal communication, nonverbal affiliative expressiveness, intimacy level, similarity, and liking.
- Similarity is positively related with verbal communication, nonverbal affiliative expressiveness, intimacy level, and liking, while it is negatively related with information seeking, and reciprocity.
- Liking is positively related with verbal communication, nonverbal affiliative expressiveness, intimacy level, and similarity, while it is negatively related with information seeking, and reciprocity.

Viewed collectively, the theorems provide a framework for examining and predicting the process of getting to know someone.

Table 2: Theorems of Uncertainty Reduction Theory

	Verbal communication	Nonverbal affiliative expressiveness	Information seeking	Intimacy level	Reciprocity	Similarity	Liking
Verbal communication		+	-	+	-	+	+
Nonverbal affiliative expressiveness	+		-	+	-	+	+
Information seeking	-	-		-	+	-	-
Intimacy level	+	+	-		-	+	+
Reciprocity	-	-	+	-		-	-
Similarity	+	+	-	+	-		+
Liking	+	+	-	+	-	+	

* Table 1 summarizes the seven axioms and their relationships as theorems

== Types of uncertainty reduction ==
According to Berger and Calabrese, uncertainty reduction has two different types with different process. Based on the two different types of uncertainty reduction, Berger and Calabrese suggest that interpersonal communication behavior has at least two different roles to play within this framework. First, communication behavior itself is what we endeavor to predict and explain. Second, communication behavior is one vehicle that enables the formulation of predictions and explanations.

=== Proactive uncertainty reduction ===
Proactive uncertainty reduction, which is making predictions of the most likely alternative actions the other person might take, is strategic communication planning prior to interaction. In initial meetings, people attempt to predict what the other may want to hear based on the meaning they acquired from previous statements, observations, or information ascertained. However, there is more to come after the initial interaction. There is a change in the intimacy of content exchanged, nonverbal exchanging, as well as reciprocity between the communicators.

=== Retroactive uncertainty reduction ===
Retroactive uncertainty reduction is the process of analyzing the situation post interaction, which refers to making explanations for the other person's behavior and interpreting the meaning of behavioral choices. For example, if a student watched a classmate present a project and their voice was shaking, the student would assume their classmate was nervous while giving the speech.

== Application ==
The uncertainty reduction theory has been applied to new relationships in recent years. Although it continues to be widely respected as a tool to explain and predict initial interaction events, it is now also employed to study intercultural interaction (Gudykunst et al., 1985), organizational socialization (Lester, 1986), and as a function of media (Katz & Blumer, 1974). Gudykunst argues it is important to test the theory in new paradigms, thus adding to its heuristic value (Gudykunst, 2004).

=== Intercultural communication ===
Study has shown that intercultural communication apprehension—the fear or anxiety with intercultural communication is positively associated with uncertainty. In addition to that, socio-communication orientation, which refers to people's ability to be a good speaker and good listener, is negatively associated with uncertainty in intercultural communication. Measures of intercultural communication apprehension and ethnocentrism are significantly and negatively correlated with measures of uncertainty reduction and communication satisfaction according to James Neuliep's study in 2012.

Studies have been conducted to determine the differences in the uses of uncertainty reduction strategies among various ethnicities. A study, conducted in the United States, suggests that significant differences are apparent. Self-disclosure has a pan-cultural effect on attributional confidence but other types of uncertainty reduction strategies appeared to be more culture-specific. "A multiple comparisons analysis using a least significance difference criterion indicated that for both self- and other-disclosure, African-Americans used greater self-disclosure than Euro-Americans, Hispanic-Americans, and Asian-Americans and perceived greater other intraethnic disclosure. The only other significant differences found in the multiple comparisons test were between self- and other-disclosure levels for Hispanic-Americans and Asian-Americans, namely, the former perceived greater self- and other-disclosure levels than Asian-Americans."

Results of study that compares verbal behaviors and perceptions in intracultural interactions and intercultural interactions during the initial communication suggest that "intercultural interactions may not be as dissimilar from intracultural interactions as has been traditionally assumed". This result also proves that the sixth axiom of uncertainty reduction theory may be weak, which claims a positive relationship between similarity and uncertainty reduction.

==== Korean-Americans and Americans ====
A study of intercultural communication between Korean-Americans and Americans conclude that Korean-Americans' uncertainty level toward Americans did not decrease as their amount of verbal communication increased. However, as Korean-Americans' intimacy level of communication content increased, their uncertainty level toward Americans decreased. But these two tested axioms are only a partially useful formulation for understanding such intercultural communication.

==== Japanese and Americans ====
Another study suggests that cultural similarities between strangers influence the selection of uncertainty reduction strategies by increasing the intent to interrogate, intent to self-disclose, and nonverbal affiliative expressiveness. The study also expressed an individual's culture influences their selection of uncertainty reduction strategies. For example, US students exhibit higher levels of interrogation and self-disclosure than in Japanese students.

==== Indian and Americans ====
Study of mock hiring interviews examines nonverbal behavior between Indian applicants and United States interviewers. It shows that the effects of the similarity/dissimilarity of interviewers' and interviewees' nonverbal behaviors exhibited during an intercultural hiring interview have some effects on interviewers' perceptions of and hiring decisions about interviewees, but such effects are much less than Berger and Calabrese claim.

=== In-group identification ===
Empirical studies have examined the relationship between the effects of self-uncertainty and in-group entitativity. One important question that was investigated was; what motivates people to join or identify with groups and engage in specific forms of inter-group behavior? Based on the concept of uncertainty reduction theory, the hypothesis that people identify most strongly with groups if they felt self-conceptual uncertainty was tested. Results revealed that people who feel self-conceptual uncertainty are motivated to join groups in which they identify with as an efficient strategy and immediate way to reduce one's self-conceptual uncertainty. Hogg bases his argument on the premise that subjective uncertainty, especially those about one's self and identity are unpleasant and that people strive to reduce uncertainties they feel about themselves.

A person's self-categorization is affected by group identification including nationality, religion, gender, ethnicity and many other associated groups. Thus people continue to try to reduce the uncertainties they feel about themselves by identifying with even more specific groups. There is also evidence that people who are highly uncertain about themselves are more likely to identify with more homogeneous groups to reduce their uncertainty of self and reach a more definite state. Generally, people will be able to reduce their self-uncertainty either significantly or to a low degree, depending on the type of group they join and to what extent one can relate to his or herself within a group.

=== Job hiring process ===
Scholarly studies have examined the practical application of uncertainty reduction theory in the context of job hiring by studying the communication process between interviewers and applicants prior and during an interview. Understanding the interview process as an interactive communication process aimed to reduce uncertainty is important to organizations, as it has been proven that the more positive and negative information about expectations and organizational norms are shared during the interview process, both by the applicant and interviewer, the greater the job satisfaction and the less turnover rates. An applicant's interview satisfaction is measured in terms of the amount of information and time given to the applicant. Findings suggest that applicants prefer conversational questions that helps them reduce uncertainties about the job they are applying to.

The interview is suggested to be the initial means of communication in which both participants thrive to reduce their uncertainties. Both interviewees and interviewers engage in strategies to reduce uncertainty.

==== Job hiring via extracted information ====
Research studies have applied uncertainty reduction theory to online information seeking utilized in the context of job hiring. Using uncertainty reduction strategies through online sources have proven to be good predictions and indicators of targeted individuals. However, findings have also concluded the negative effects on job applicants when negative information is obtained by employers via online sources that may conflict with the already developed perception of the job applicant obtained from normal means such as résumés and cover letters.

Furthermore, online information's effect on job applicants has been widely discussed, as many guide books now suggest that applicants minimize what could be preserved by employers as negative presence in their online communities and strategically enhance any positive presence. As more organizations are including online information extract as part of their recruiting process, empirical results show that applicants with negative online presence are perceived as less qualified than those with a positive or neutral online presence.

=== Workplace ===
In any workplace, changes are expected, and these changes can be accompanied by feelings of uncertainty in employees. An important question to ask whenever any changes appear is how willing the employees are to adapt to these changes. A change in any aspect of life can be stressful, so when employees are willing to step up and accept any changes that come their way, it makes the change itself much easier to deal with. Supervisors, or anyone in a position of leadership can soften the blow anytime a change occurs. Communication is key, but a good, strong sense of leadership is important as well. Reimer, Haensse, and Lin-Hi's primary purpose in creating this particular study was to examine the impact of CSR (corporate social responsibility) on employee readiness for change. Their findings indicated uncertainty in regard to changes in the workplace had a negative effect on employee readiness to change, and ultimately that POS (perceived organizational support) is linked to CSR and readiness for change. This link is built on reducing change related uncertainty, as well as increasing the readiness for change.

Whenever new staff enter a workplace, human resources is a critical chunk of ensuring those new employees are given the tools necessary to succeed. Peng, Lee, and Ya-Hui created their study around the effects that good human resources can have on employees and things such as promoting the learning and use of new skills, decreasing the financial blows that could be caused by reduced productivity in a workplace, as well as with staff turnover, and lastly making sure the new employees stay and want to stay at their new jobs. In this study it was found that that HRM (Human resource management) has an indirect effect on workplace satisfaction and turnover retention, and they found that only positive emotions could be associated with negative effects on employee turnover retention.

=== Medical treatment ===
When our health and wellness is in doubt, we usually ask doctors and nurses for help to reduce the anxiety associated with uncertainty. This is the process of reducing uncertainty. According to Stephen W. Littlejohn, Karen A. Foss, "Uncertainty reduction theory has been used to guide examination of the ways e-mail is used between doctors and patients to provide relevant information concerning health care diagnosis and treatment." In addition, Vivian C. Sheer and Rebecca J. Cline proposed and tested a model of perceived information adequacy and uncertainty reduction in doctor‐patient interactions.

=== Computer-mediated communication ===
Given that uncertainty reduction theory was primarily developed for face-to-face interactions, critics have questioned the theory's applicability to computer-mediated communication (CMC). Pratt, Wiseman, Cody and Wendt argue that the theory is only partially effective in asynchronous, computer-mediated environments. Although many computer mediated communications limit the possibility of utilizing many traditional social cues theories, such as social information processing and the hyperpersonal model, suggest individuals are quite capable of reducing uncertainties and developing intimate relationships.

Antheunis, Marjolijn L., et al. investigated whether language-based strategies, employed by computer-mediated communication users, would aid in reducing uncertainties despite the absence of nonverbal cues. Examining three interactive uncertainty reduction strategies (i.e., self-disclosure, question asking, and question/disclosure intimacy) in computer mediated communications, the study questioned the use of language-based strategies to three communication options: face-to-face, visual CMC supported by a webcam, or text-only CMC. It finds that "text-only CMC interactants made a greater proportion of affection statements than face-to-face interactants. Proportions of question asking and question/disclosure intimacy were higher in both CMC conditions than in the face-to-face condition, but only question asking mediated the relationship between CMC and verbal statements of affection."

In addition, a study was conducted on 704 members of a social networking site to see what reduction theory strategies they used while gaining information on people they had recently met in person. All respondents used passive, active and interactive strategies, but the most common and beneficial strategy was the interactive strategy through which people show a perceived similarity and increasing social attraction.

==== Online shopping ====
In recent decades, online shopping has expanded considerably. The pandemic left it as a practical means of acquiring necessities, which helped this expansion. There is a lot of uncertainty with products over the internet as opposed to the physicality of going into a store and seeing the product. Product demonstrations can help with customer uncertainty as it details any aspect of a product that customers may be looking for. This should hopefully, alleviate uncertainty with virtual shopping. B2B (business-to-business) transactions have evolved to emphasize a greater approach between the buyer and seller in each transaction. Sellers believe that understanding customer journeys can help them understand customers' wants and needs better. Uncertainty can be reduced when there is communication between the buyers and sellers.

==== Online auctions ====
In an online consumer-to-consumer (C2C) e-commerce context, transactions usually happen directly between individuals with a third party involved acting as an intermediary or a communication platform, but not guaranteeing that the transaction happens. Therefore, C2C e-commerce platforms constantly involve initial interaction between strangers that is motivated by the desire to exchange a product for money. Such environments are a significant risk for both the seller and the buyer, given the financial and psychological cost of a transaction failing because of a lack of information.

Online auction platforms such as eBay are considered to be risky and uncertain environments for exchange, especially from the standpoint of the bidder, as there is limited information available regarding both the merchandise and the seller.

Using uncertainty reduction theory and predicted outcome value theory, a study of 6477 randomly selected data sets of auctions conducted on eBay.com indicated that the more detailed information about a certain product was available as part of the product description the more bids there were and the higher the final bid was. In addition, a higher seller's reputation resulted in more bids and a higher selling price. One means to reduce the uncertainty of a product's worth is having extensive descriptions and pictures of the item available and more positive feedback from previous users.

Findings from the study illustrate that uncertainty reduction theory provides an insightful framework in which individuals' initial interactions in the context of online auctions can be understood. The study also provides evidence that strategies for reducing uncertainty in online initial interaction are similar to those used in face-to-face transactions. Although online auction users seem to favor passive strategies, including viewing product information and seller reputation, there are more active strategies in use: a user may look up the seller in other online platforms to gather relevant information or may use an interactive strategy, sending a private message to the seller asking for more information.

==== Vacationing ====
Yan and Gong conducted a study to understand uncertainty in regard to property. This particular study uses Airbnb as a basis and discusses how guests struggle to mitigate property quality uncertainty and property fit uncertainty regarding renting an Airbnb. Lack of information presented from online transactions can raise uncertainty. Guests or renters particularly struggle with assessing how the particular property will accommodate their desired performance, and they also have a difficult time trying to assess if the specific property will match their preferences. At the end of the study, Yan and Gong had found the following: Online property reviews and online textual descriptions were negatively associated with both fit and quality uncertainty. Lastly, online instant messenger was also negatively associated with these two forms of uncertainty, and that usage experience had a significant influence on Airbnb use intention in particular.

Vacationing in general leads to great uncertainty, not just with Airbnb. There are many factors that go into whether or not an individual or a family will return to a vacation location after having previously visited. Tourists will take every detail into account, before and during their visit. These can include things such as variety and cost of food, quality of rooms, employee performance, the quantity and quality of activities available, and the overall price of the whole experience. Websites for a location may fail to mention risks and the level of security. Cahigas, Prasetyo, Nadlifatin, Persada, and Gumasing conducted a study to ultimately determine how continuous visits to a location are influenced. It was found that tourists prioritized the physical environment of a location and the quality of employee service, they did not care as much about the food and beverage variety. Price acceptance was also found to be influential of customer satisfaction, and this showed that more tourists would return in the future to a set location if they were satisfied.

==== Online dating ====
Online dating sites typically bring together individuals who have no prior contact with one another and no shared physical space where nonverbal cues can be communicated through gestures, facial expression and physical distance. This limited access to nonverbal cues produces a different set of concerns for individuals, as well as a different set of tools for reducing uncertainty. Gibbs, Ellison and Lai report that individuals on online dating websites attempt to reduce uncertainty at three levels: personal security, misrepresentation, and recognition. The asynchronous nature of the communications and the added privacy concerns may make people want to engage in interactive behaviors and seek confirmatory information sooner than those who engage in offline dating.

Online dating mainly supports passive strategies for reducing uncertainties. The option to view profiles online without needing to directly contact an individual is the main premise of passively reducing uncertainties. Gibbs, et al. found that "participants who used uncertainty reduction strategies tended to disclose more personal information in terms of revealing private thoughts and feelings, suggesting a process whereby online dating participants proactively engage in uncertainty reduction activities to confirm the private information of others, which then prompts their own disclosure."

==== Online surrogacy ads ====
Parents and surrogate mothers have great incentive for reducing uncertainty, taking optimal control, and finding a suitable third party for their pregnancy process. May and Tenzek assert that three themes emerged from their study of online ads from surrogate mothers: idealism, logistics, and personal information. Idealism refers to surrogates' decision to share details regarding their lifestyle and health. Logistics refers to the surrogates' requested financial needs and services. Personal information refers to the disclosure of details that would typically take several interactions before occurring, but has the benefit of adding a degree of tangible humanness to the surrogate (e.g. the disclosure of family photos). Idealism, logistics and personal information all function to reduce potential parents' uncertainty about a surrogate mother.

==== Social media ====
Social media has become an indispensable part of our daily lives. In this new media era, a lot of communications has moved from offline to online. In online communication, people still face so many uncertainties, which motivate them to reduce uncertainty. There are a lot of scholars studying the uncertainty reduction in the social media platforms. Cynthia Palmieri, Kristen Prestano, Rosalie Gandley, Emily Overton and Qin Zhang investigated the effects of self-disclosure on Facebook on perceived uncertainty reduction. The findings revealed the levels of self-disclosure on an individual's Facebook Page affect perceived uncertainty about that individual. Stephanie Tom Tong discussed information-seeking behaviors during the stages of relationship termination. Relational dissolution is a socially embedded activity, and affordances of social network sites offer many advantages in reducing uncertainty after a breakup. A survey collected responses from those who use Facebook to gather information about their romantic ex-partners.

In addition to social media having become a staple of modern society, accompanied by that is the use of emoticons and emojis. These are icons or faces that could represent a wide array of emotions, objects, occupations, countries, and many other things. Writing for California State University, Jaebong Son and Arash Negahban discussed the impact and effects of emojis and emoticons in the context of natural disasters and how these may impact communication received or output in such an event. Emoticons and emojis primarily exist to fill in gaps created over CMC and nonverbal cues. Oftentimes, certain emoticons and emojis can be repurposed to mean other things apart from what was intended in their initial creation. For example, the eggplant emoji is often used to represent male genitalia, and the crying and skull emojis have also been repurposed to represent laughter, as opposed to sadness and death.

When it comes to social media, fan pages are found to be quite common. Celebrities, brands, specific products, are all things one could find fan pages on. They can actually be an effective marketing technique for businesses, and it is free. Shin, Hall, Lee, and Han set out to explore the satisfaction with social media networking sites. Around 2 billion people can discover small businesses through these fan pages on Facebook, so it explains why companies make use of this free marketing technique that essentially requires them to do almost nothing. In addition to using the General Systems Theory, they found that satisfaction is incredibly important for users when deciding if they want to use Facebook continuously, and if their experience is a positive one, then it can lead to even more increased satisfaction on their end.

=== Long-distance relationships ===
Long-distance romantic relationships may be tough for all involved for numerous different reasons. Due to the lack of seeing a partner face-to-face regularly, it is of no surprise that uncertainty may build up in long-distance relationships. Uncertainty may lead to undesirable relational outcomes and certainty can also be problematic in long distance romantic relationships if there is certainty that a situation will end in an undesirable outcome. According to Katherine C. Maguire, when uncertainty reduction leads to a negative predicted outcome, it is then that the relationship will end. While it is true that certainty may lead to an undesirable relational outcome, research shows that engaging in uncertainty reduction strategies over long distance romantic relationships is beneficial for the relationship at large.

=== Use of AI ===
The use and expansion of AI in recent years have been the subject of numerous controversies. Many people entering the job hunt are worried of potential jobs being stolen and/or replaced by AI. In the entertainment industry in particular, many also worry AI will take priority in the workplace over human talent. Americans in particular believe AI to have risks that outweigh any and all potential positives. What Justin Cheung and Shirley Ho set out to do was explore the relationship between trust and AI. The study contained itself to AI being used for tourism, daily commutes, and travel across the country and between cities. Their study found that direct relationships between attitude and intention to use AI for these purposes were all found to be significant.

=== Training effectiveness ===
Training literature has been shown to be on a rise in terms of those studying the effectiveness of training. Most of these studies however seem to care not for detailing the negative aspects of training related behaviors, choosing to focus only on the positives. In their studies, Baig and Naqvi found a few relations. Communication from the trainer is positively related towards the satisfaction of the trainee, perceived support from the trainer can have a positive impact on the satisfaction experienced from the trainee.

== Critique ==
=== Scope of the axioms and theorems ===
Due to the law-like framework to explain and predict other's behavior, if a particular theorem is disproved, it destroys the axiological base upon which it rests. Through their studies with 1,159 students from 10 universities in the United States, Kathy Kellerman and Rodney Reynolds conclude that "no need exists to integrate concern for uncertainty reduction into the axiomatic framework" (1990). They also provide evidence with their studies that there is no association between information seeking and level of uncertainty, which disprove axiom 3 developed by Berger and Calabrese.

=== Uncertainty measurement ===
In addition, the subjectivity of people's self-assessment render the premise of uncertainty reduction problematic. The generation of uncertainty comes from people's lack of knowledge about themselves, information and environment. However, it is primarily people's self-perception about one's own cognitions and ability that cause uncertainty, and this self-perception itself is hard to measure. In Brashers' study on uncertainty management's application to health communication, he explains the uncertainty of self-perception that people's feeling of uncertain is not necessarily correspond to its self-assessment of available knowledge.

=== Beyond initial interaction ===
Uncertainty reduction theory has been cast doubt on its association with communication beyond initial interaction. Planalp and Honeycutt suggest that people's potential changes, lack of understanding each other, or impetuous behavior will increase uncertainty in communication outside initial interaction. Their study questions the assumption that increased knowledge of other people and relationships will help social actors to function effectively in the social world. However, their findings provide supportive evidence that uncertainty (in long-term relationships) usually impacts negatively on the relationship.

=== Motivation to reduce uncertainty ===
Uncertainty reduction theory has sparked much discussion in the discipline of communication. Critics have argued that reducing uncertainty is not the driving force of interaction. Michael Sunnafrank's predicted outcome value theory (1986) indicated that the actual motivation for interaction is a desire for positive relational experiences. In other words, individuals engaging in initial interactions are motivated by rewards opposed to reducing uncertainties. According to Sunnafrank, when we communicate we are attempting to predict certain outcome to maximize the relational outcomes. Kellerman and Reynolds (1990) pointed out that sometimes there are high level of uncertainty in interaction that no one wants to reduce. Their study find that the central determinant of both information seeking (axiom 3) and liking (axiom 4) is the predicted outcome values rather than reducing uncertainty.

==== Motivation to reduce uncertainty (MRU) model ====
The uncertainty reduction theory also lead to the formation of a model originated by Michael W. Kramer. Kramer presents some major tenets and criticisms of the uncertainty reduction theory and then propose a motivation to reduce uncertainty (MRU) model.

MRU suggests that different levels of motivation to reduce uncertainty can lead to certain communication behaviors depending on competing goals.

MRU suggests at least four different reasons for low motivation to seek information:

- People do not experience uncertainty in every event or encounter. Predictable or easily understood situations will not result in significant levels of uncertainty.
- Individuals have different levels of tolerance for uncertainty. The more one tolerates uncertainty the less information one seeks.
- Because communication always has social or effort costs, minimizing those costs with limited effort may be preferable to information seeking.
- Individuals may also create certainty with minimal information seeking and without overt communication. For example, classification systems, such as stereotyping, create certainty out of uncertain situations.

Research demonstrates that MRU could be used to examine how employees manage uncertainty during adjustment processes. MRU uses theoretical explanations for examining the approaches to understanding group decision making. "When groups are highly motivated to reduce the uncertainty surrounding a decision and there are no competing motives such as time or cost limitations, highly rational behaviors lead to information seeking to reduce uncertainty to optimize decisions." MRU could be used at the organizational level to examine communication related to organizational strategy.

=== Anxiety/uncertainty management theory ===
Inspired by Berger's theory, the late California State, Fullerton, communication professor William Gudykunst began to apply some of the axioms and theorems of uncertainty reduction theory to intercultural settings. Despite their common axiomatic format and parallel focus on the meeting of strangers, this theory contrasts uncertainty reduction theory by identifying reduction as only one of the many actions that people take when uncertainty arises.

Gudykunst's anxiety/uncertainty management theory (AUM) also differs from Berger's uncertainty reduction theory in several significant ways. First, AUM asserts that people do not always try to reduce uncertainty. When uncertainty allows people to maintain positive predicted outcome values, they may choose to manage their information intake such that they balance their level of uncertainty. Second, AUM claims that people experience uncertainty differently in different situations. People must evaluate whether a particular instance of uncertainty is stressful, and if so, what resources are available.

Gudykunst also points out that uncertainty reduction theory was formulated to describe the actions and behaviors of middle-class, white strangers in the United States. This is the demographic in the studies Berger and Calabrese used to develop the theory.

==== Example: Online cancer research ====
Hurley, Kosenko and Brashers argue that 65% of internet-based cancer news is associated with the increase of uncertainty. In order of their degree of magnitude, information regarding treatment, prevention, detection, survivorship, and end-of-life issues yielded the most uncertainty. Given the inverse relationship between information-seeking behavior and uncertainty reduction, Hurley, Kosenko and Brashers assert that uncertainty management theory may be more accurate and effective than uncertainty reduction theory. More research is needed to determine what computer-mediated communications exacerbate and help individuals manage their uncertainty regarding their health.

=== Eurocentric ===
Uncertainty reduction theory has its history of being applicable to Western cultures, especially the United States, but there is not much research proving its usefulness in other cultures. Riley Beard, in her critique of uncertainty reduction theory, claims that it disregards other ways of reducing uncertainty that may be prevalent in other cultures.

=== Context of URT ===
As stated above, uncertainty reduction theory was originated to fit a context of initial, face-to-face interactions in Western cultures. The history of URT being applicable in first time face-to-face interactions is valid, but there is little research that shows uncertainty reduction theory is applicable in many contexts other than the one that the theory is rooted in.

=== Defense ===
Eleven years after uncertainty reduction theory was introduced, Berger published Uncertain Outcome Values in Predicted Relationships: Uncertainty Reduction Theory Then and Now. His aim was to defend his theory in new contexts and modify it, as necessary. Berger later proposed three types of information seeking behavior: passive (watching the interactant for clues in reactions to stimuli), active (posing questions to other individuals about the interactant), and interactive (posing direct questions to the interactant). Later research by Berger and Bradac (1982) indicated that disclosures by interactants may lead them to be judged as more or less attractive. The judgment will determine whether the judge will continue to reduce their uncertainties or end the relationship. Berger also acknowledges the works of Gudykunst, et al. (1985) and Parks and Adelman (1983) to extend uncertainty reduction theory to the realm of more established relationships.

== See also ==
- List of basic communication topics
