= Community structure theory =

Community structure theory is a framework for analyzing society's influence on media coverage. It was identified by Funk and McCombs (2015) as the “conceptual inverse” of agenda-setting, focusing on demographic characteristics of communities shaping news instead of news as a driver of public perception. For example, community structure theory has found repeated links between indicators of vulnerability (such as unemployment levels, poverty levels, crime rate, etc.) and favorable coverage of critical US national issues such as immigration reform or universal health care. In cross-national studies comparing national characteristics and reporting on human trafficking, HIV/AIDS treatment access, water handling/contamination, and child labor, media coverage varied significantly with levels of "female empowerment"— female literacy rate, female child life expectancy, and female school life expectancy.

== Early influences ==
The modern community structure model originated with the work of University of Chicago's Robert Park, who in The Immigrant Press and Its Control first suggested society could influence media. Morris Janowitz later introduced the concept that press coverage could serve as an index of the social structure and values of distinct communities. Janowitz employed multiple methodologies for his research, including reader surveys, in-depth interviews with journalists, and content analysis of 82 different community newspapers in the Chicago area.

Tichenor, Donohue and Olien evolved Park's and Janowitz's work with their concept of structural pluralism, finding differences between newspaper reporting in smaller, relatively homogeneous metropolitan areas and that in larger, more demographically diverse areas, the latter manifesting more progressive coverage. These University of Minnesota theorists later developed the “guard dog” hypothesis, emphasizing the “social control” role of media, whereby local media function less as watchdogs and more as guard dogs protecting the interests of powerful, elite members of society.

Other scholars in the late 90s (Hindman, 1999; Demers & Viswanath, 1999; McLeod and Hertog, 1999) also recognized a connection between mass media coverage and community characteristics, but emphasized the role of media less as mechanisms for social control than for social change. When Hindman compared media coverage in large vs. small ethic populations, he found a difference in how similar stories were covered based on the relative size of ethnic groups in communities. Similarly, McLeod and Hertog (1999) found news media covered protest mobilizations more favorably in communities with a greater numbers of protesters. Demers and Viswanath (1999) enhanced previous structural findings by exploring the role of media as agents of both social control and social change.

With the introduction of digital tools for analyzing media texts, the community structure model or approach was successfully expanded, tested, and used to study systematic news reports of critical events in communities across the nation and throughout the world by John C. Pollock, who began identifying this work as “Community Structure” research.

== Contemporary applications ==
Pollock and coauthors made three key contributions to community structure theory. First, they conducted among the first US nationwide and cross-national studies using the community structure model, comparing multiple large metropolitan areas and countries, expanding study sample sizes beyond a focus on one or two cities. Second, Pollock et al. also evolved the theory to include a Media Vector methodological tool for measuring both content direction and editorial prominence of articles, then combining them into a single score, thereby adding a way to consider editorial evaluation as well as article content. Third, Pollock and coauthor findings often challenged the traditional “guard dog” hypothesis by concluding that media can often reflect the interests of more vulnerable stakeholders. Community structure studies are related to work focusing on the roles of social capital (in political science and sociology literatures) and social determinants of health (in health communication and public health literatures) and social ecological models (in sociology and public health). In 2008, Pollock authored the entry on the "Community Structure model" for the International Encyclopedia of Communication, and in 2013, he authored an authoritative annotated bibliography on Community Structure scholarship for Oxford Bibliographies Online.
