= Charles Berger (academic) =

American professor of communication (1939–2018)

Charles R. Berger
- Born: June 4, 1939; Philadelphia, PA
- Died: September 25, 2018 (aged 79); Davis, CA
- Education: Penn State University (B.S.), Michigan State University, (Ph.D.)

Charles R. Berger (June 4, 1939 – September 25, 2018) was an American professor emeritus of communication at the University of California, Davis. Berger died on September 25, 2018, from health complications arising from cancer.

== Education ==
Berger received his B.S. in Psychology from Pennsylvania State University. After completing his undergraduate studies, he attended Michigan State University where he received his M.A. and Ph.D. in Communication.

== Career ==
He was a Fellow and former president of the International Communication Association. Berger was best known for his formulation of uncertainty reduction theory.

His research interests included message production processes and the processing of threat-related messages by intuitive and rational systems.

He was the former editor of Human Communication Research and co-editor (with Sandra Ball Rokeach) of Communication Research. He was a member of several editorial boards of communication journals. He also was an area editor for the International Encyclopedia of Communication.

He was a Fellow and a Past President of the International Communication Association. He was a co-recipient (with Judee Burgoon) of NCA's Mark Knapp Award. Berger lived in Davis, California with his wife.

== Uncertainty reduction theory ==
Charles Berger was integral to formulating uncertainty reduction theory, which explains how humans utilize communication strategies to reduce their uncertainties about other human beings. The theory seeks to understand the differences in strategies that people use to make conversations and communication go as smoothly as possible. People want to limit uncertainty and awkwardness, so they employ varied communication techniques. This theory was introduced by Berger in 1975 and furthered his focus on the study of interpersonal communication. Berger's findings led to an understanding of uncertainty reduction theory and allowed people to take a deeper look into interactions with one another. Furthermore, Berger was able to bring understanding to why and how we use different communicative techniques to reduce uncertainty among each other.

== Publications ==
Berger has published over 100 articles and book chapters. He co-edited the first edition of the Handbook of Communication Science with Steven H. Chaffee. He Co-edited the second edition of the Handbook of Communication Science with Michael Roloff and David R. Ewoldsen.

=== Books ===
- Berger, Charles R.; Burgoon, Michael (May 1998). Communication and Social Influence Processes. Michigan State University Press. ISBN 978-0870134876.
- Berger, Charles R.; Bradac, James J. (November 1982). Language and Social Knowledge: Uncertainty in Interpersonal Relations. Hodder Arnold. ISBN 978-0713161960.
- Berger, Charles R. (July 1997). Planning Strategic Interaction: Attaining Goals Through Communicative Action. Routledge. ISBN 978-0805823080.
- Roloff, Michael Elwood; Berger, Charles R. (February 1983). Social cognition and communication. Sage Publications. ISBN 978-0803918986.
- Berger, Charles R.; Roloff, Michael Elwood; Ewoldsen, David R. (July 2009). The Handbook of Communication Science. Sage Publications. ISBN 978-1412918138.

=== Papers ===
- Berger, Charles R.; Calabrese, Richard J. (December 1975). "Some Explorations in Initial Interaction and Beyond: Toward a Developmental Theory of Interpersonal Communication". Human Communication Research. 1 (2): 99–112. doi:10.1111/j.1468-2958.1975.tb00258.x.
- Berger, Charles R. (1979). "Beyond initial interaction: Uncertainty, understanding, and the development of interpersonal".
- Berger, Charles R. (1 July 1987). Roloff, Michael E.; Miller, Gerald R. (eds.). Communicating under uncertainty. Vol. 14. SAGE Publications. pp. 39–62. ISBN 978-0-8039-2654-7.

== See also ==
- Communication theory
- Communication studies
- Uncertainty reduction theory
