= Ideal managerial climate =

Ideal managerial climate (IMC) is a concept within organizational communication. Introduced by W. Charles Redding in 1972, this theoretical concept serves as a comprehensive model for management, and organizations as a whole, that places emphasis on relationships, interactions, and leadership functions. IMC furthers discussion in organizational communication beyond formal relations and structures, and assesses those characteristics that can produce the most ideal environment in an organization, and/or its management. This model presents an ideal situation rather than an attainable one, and should be a used as a tool for comparison, self-assessment, and improvement for organizations.

== Theoretical perspective ==
W. Charles Redding, commonly credited as the father of organizational communication, conducted significant research that made substantial contributions to organizational and managerial communication. Redding was one of the first to investigate the climates of organizations. His quantitative studies examined communicative dynamics among the members of organizations across various structures. Prior to Redding’s contributions, research pertaining to organizational climate was limited specifically to the analysis of events or isolated messages rather than the larger dynamics of the organization. Based on his findings, Redding developed a prescriptive model for managers known as the ideal managerial climate, which connects leadership functions to the organizational communication climate. Redding claimed that any experience in an organizational setting is a message, including both nonverbal and verbal communication. Message and message-related practices are the basic premise by which organizational environments and climates are created. Climate can be defined as “the psychological environment in which organizational behavior occurs.” As this applies to organizational communication, “organizational climate” can be defined as the relationships and interactions that contribute to the formation of workplace environments among and across various organizational structures. Redding states that “the communication ‘climate’ of the organization is more crucial than are communication skills or techniques (taken by themselves) in creating an effective organization.” When evaluating organizational climate using IMC, the ideal productive environment of an organizational is related to the culture and values an organization possesses.

== Components of IMC ==
Based on Redding’s research and consultation experience, he found five dynamics to be key in the attempt to produce a stable, satisfying, and content atmosphere in the workplace. These characteristics were reflective on organizational productivity, preventing workplace conflicts, and positive influence and fluency in organizational structure.

1. Trust: Trust, confidence, and credibility should be maintained in the relationships between members of the organization at all levels of the hierarchy.
2. Supportiveness: Personnel should feel free to speak what is on their minds in an atmosphere of acceptance, regardless of their positioning as superior or subordinate.
3. Openness: The dynamics in an organizational setting should be clear and free of confusion. However, although there may be formal hierarchical structures, communication should be not limited by rigid boundaries.
4. Emphasis on high-performance goals: All members of an organization should be committed to high-performance goals such as high productivity, high quality, low cost, and a concern for other members.
5. Participative decision-making: Employees at all levels in the organization should be communicated to and consulted with in decision-making and goal-setting relevant to their positions.
6. Emotional connections: If employees feel an emotional connection to the work that is facilitated through the manager, work will be done more effectively and the employees will be able to be more productive.

== Expansion of IMC ==
In 1976, Peterson and Pace expanded on the IMC model with the development of the communication climate inventory (CCI). Similar to Redding’s, this model was designed to analyze the communication dynamics of an organizational setting according to six categories of “communication effects.” Peterson and Pace used the five components of IMC as a foundational premise upon which to base their model.
