= Organizational communication =

Field of study in communication studies

Within the realm of communication studies, organizational communication is a field of study surrounding all areas of communication and information flow that contribute to the functioning of an organization . Organizational communication is constantly evolving and as a result, the scope of organizations included in this field of research have also shifted over time. Now both traditionally profitable companies, as well as NGO's and non-profit organizations, are points of interest for scholars focused on the field of organizational communication. Organizations are formed and sustained through continuous communication between members of the organization and both internal and external sub-groups who possess shared objectives for the organization. The flow of communication encompasses internal and external stakeholders and can be formal or informal.

== History ==
The field traces its lineage through business information, business communication, and early mass communication studies published in the 1930s through the 1950s. Until then, organizational communication as a discipline consisted of a few professors within speech departments who had a particular interest in speaking and writing in business settings. The current field is established with its own theories and empirical concerns distinct from other fields.

Several seminal publications stand out as works broadening the scope and recognizing the importance of communication in the organizing process, and in using the term "organizational communication". Nobel laureate Herbert A. Simon wrote in 1947 about "organization communications systems", saying communication is "absolutely essential to organizations". W. Charles Redding played a prominent role in the establishment of organizational communication as a discipline.

In the 1950s, organizational communication focused largely on the role of communication in improving organizational life and organizational output. In the 1980s, the field turned away from a business-oriented approach to communication and became concerned more with the constitutive role of communication in organizing. In the 1990s, the rise of critical theory garnered influence within the field as organizational communication scholars focused more on communication's ability to both oppress and liberate organizational members. This shift in thought arose from the French postulations brought about by theorist Michel Foucault. Foucault is often revered as the father of Post-modern thought and has been described as a “radical relativist” by contemporaries such as Camille Paglia.

From the 2000s onward, organizational communications experienced a “discursive turn”. This turn started in the 1980s with the rise of globalization and explains the changed relationship between organizations and governments. After 1980, interpretive and critical organizational communication research expanded rapidly and combined with functionalist research, creating a much more varied and complex landscape. Governments around the world became increasingly interested in multilateral organizations and began supporting their goals and interests; this factor increased the profits for investors who were able to capitalize on the changes occurring. In the early 2000s, organizational communications saw discoveries of illegality and corruption, which led to the bankruptcies of extremely large organizations (Ex. Arthur Anderson). As a result, it changed how people see ethics and corporate social responsibility in organizational communications. Organizational communication became richer and more fragmented as structural-functional perspectives waned. For the future of this field, it is inevitable that diversity will lead to intellectual competition, and that hierarchy will be established among perspectives.

In the most recent history of the last five years, organizational communications have seen huge differences in how public opinion sees mass media. This shift has led to began to move away from traditional news sources like the newspaper and rely more on social media like Twitter for their news sources. With this change, communication is more vulnerable to things like “fake news”; however, it gives all members of the public the capability of sharing their stories. With the rapid advancement of technology, there is no telling how far the field of organizational communications will advance in years to come.

== Early underlying assumptions ==
Some of the main assumptions underlying much of the early organizational communication research were:

- Humans act rationally. Some people do not behave in rational ways, they generally don't have access to all of the information needed to make rational decisions they could articulate, and therefore will make irrational decisions, unless there is some breakdown in the communication process—which is common. Irrational people rationalize how they will rationalize their communication measures whether or not it is rational.
- Formal logic and empirically verifiable data ought to be the foundation upon which any theory should rest. All we really need to understand communication in organizations is (a) observable and replicable behaviors that can be transformed into variables by some form of measurement, and (b) formally replicable syllogisms that can extend theory from observed data to other groups and settings
- Communication is primarily a mechanical process, in which a message is constructed and encoded by a sender, transmitted through some channel, then received and decoded by a receiver. Distortion, represented as any differences between the original and the received messages, can and ought to be identified and reduced or eliminated.
- Organizations are mechanical things, in which the parts (including employees functioning in defined roles) are interchangeable. What works in one organization will work in another similar organization. Individual differences can be minimized or even eliminated with careful management techniques.
- Organizations function as a container within which communication takes place. Any differences in form or function of communication between that occurring in an organization and in another setting can be identified and studied as factors affecting the communicative activity.

Herbert A. Simon introduced the concept of bounded rationality which challenged assumptions about the perfect rationality of communication participants. He maintained that people making decisions in organizations seldom had complete information, and that even if more information was available, they tended to pick the first acceptable option, rather than exploring further to pick the optimal solution.

In the early 1990s Peter Senge developed new theories on organizational communication. These theories were learning organization and systems thinking. These have been well received and are now a mainstay in current beliefs toward organizational communications.

Robert Craig suggested that there were seven components of communication theory, seven different ways of thinking about how communication works in the world. The seven different domains are rhetorical, semiotic, phenomenological, cybernetic, sociopsychological, sociocultural and critical. The rhetorical approach can be theorized as the practical art of discourse and the semiotic approach theorized as intersubjective mediation by signs. The phenomenological approach can be theorized as experiences of otherness; dialogue, and the cybernetic approach as information processing. The socialpsychological approach can be theorized as expression, interaction and influence. The sociocultural approach is theorized as (Re)production of social order and the critical approach theorized as discursive reflection.

=== Communication networks ===
Networks are another aspect of direction and flow of communication. Bavelas has shown that communication patterns, or networks, influence groups in several important ways. Communication networks may affect the group's completion of the assigned task on time, the position of the de facto leader in the group, or they may affect the group members' satisfaction from occupying certain positions in the network. Although these findings are based on laboratory experiments, they have important implications for the dynamics of communication in formal organizations.

There are several patterns of communication, such as "chain", "wheel", "star", "all-channel" network, and "circle".

== Interorganization communication ==
=== Flow nomenclature ===
Abbreviations are used to indicate the two-way flow of information or other transactions, e.g. B2B is "business to business". Duplex point-to-point communication systems, computer networks, non-electronic telecommunications, and meetings in person are all possible with the use of these terms. Examples:

- In Business
  - B2B (business-to-business)
  - B2C (business-to-consumers)
  - B2E (business-to-employees)
  - B2G (business-to-government)
- In Governance
  - G2G (government-to-government)
  - G2C (government-to-citizens)
  - G2E (government-to-employees)
  - G2B (government-to-business)
- In Society
  - C2B (consumer-to-business)
  - C2C (consumer-to-consumer)
    - or (customer-to-customer)
    - or (citizen-to-citizen)

== Interpersonal communication ==
Interpersonal communication amongst individuals can be expressed both verbally and non-verbally, such as through the use of gestures, facial expressions, and overall body language.

Managers do not need answers to operate a successful business; they need questions. Answers can come from anyone, anytime, anywhere in the world due to the plethora of electronic communication tools at our disposal. This has turned the real job of management into determining what business specifically needs to know, along with the who/what/where/when and how of learning it. To effectively solve problems, seize opportunities, and achieve objectives, questions need to be asked by managers—these are the people responsible for the operation of the enterprise as a whole.

Ideally, the meanings sent are the meanings received. This is most often the case when the messages concern something that can be verified objectively. For example, "This piece of pipe fits the threads on the coupling." In this case, the receiver of the message can check the sender's words by actual trial, if necessary. However, when the sender's words describe a feeling or an opinion about something that cannot be checked objectively, meanings can be very unclear. "This work is too hard" or "Watergate was politically justified" are examples of opinions or feelings that cannot be verified. Thus, they are subject to interpretation and hence to distorted meanings. The receiver's background of experience and learning may differ enough from that of the sender to cause significantly different perceptions and evaluations of the topic under discussion. As we shall see later, such differences form a basic barrier to communication.

Nonverbal content always accompanies the verbal content of messages. When speaking about nonverbal communication, Birdwhistell says "it is complementary to (meaning "adds to") rather than redundant with (or repeating of) the verbal behavior". For example, if someone is talking about the length of an object, they may hold out their hands to give a visual estimate of it. This is reasonably clear in the case of face-to-face communication. As Virginia Satir has pointed out, people cannot help but communicate symbolically (for example, through their clothing or possessions) or through some form of body language. In messages that are conveyed by the telephone, a messenger, or a letter, the situation or context in which the message is sent becomes part of its non-verbal content. For example, if the company has been losing money, and in a letter to the production division, the front office orders a reorganization of the shipping and receiving departments, this could be construed to mean that some people were going to lose their jobs — unless it were made explicitly clear that this would not occur.

A number of variables influence the effectiveness of communication. Some are found in the environment in which communication takes place, some in the personalities of the sender and the receiver, and some in the relationship that exists between sender and receiver. These different variables suggest some of the difficulties of communicating with understanding between two people. The sender wants to formulate an idea and communicate it to the receiver. This desire to communicate may arise from his thoughts or feelings or it may have been triggered by something in the environment. The communication may also be influenced by the relationship between the sender and the receiver, such as status differences, a staff-line relationship, or a learner-teacher relationship.

Whatever its origin, information travels through a series of filters, both in the sender and in the receiver, and is affected by different channels, before the idea can be transmitted and re-created in the receiver's mind. Physical capacities to see, hear, smell, taste, and touch vary between people, so that the image of reality may be distorted even before the mind goes to work. In addition to physical or sense filters, cognitive filters, or the way in which an individual's mind interprets the world around him, will influence his assumptions and feelings. These filters will determine what the sender of a message says, how he says it, and with what purpose. Filters are present also in the receiver, creating a double complexity that once led Robert Louis Stevenson to say that human communication is "doubly relative". It takes one person to say something and another to decide what he said.

Physical and cognitive, including semantic filters (which decide the meaning of words) combine to form a part of our memory system that helps us respond to reality. In this sense, March and Simon compare a person to a data processing system. Behavior results from an interaction between a person's internal state and environmental stimuli. What we have learned through past experience becomes an inventory, or data bank, consisting of values or goals, sets of expectations and preconceptions about the consequences of acting one way or another, and a variety of possible ways of responding to the situation. This memory system determines what things we will notice and respond to in the environment. At the same time, stimuli in the environment help to determine what parts of the memory system will be activated. Hence, the memory and the environment form an interactive system that causes our behavior. As this interactive system responds to new experiences, new learnings occur which feed back into memory and gradually change its content. This process is how people adapt to a changing world.

== Formal and informal ==
Informal and formal communication are used in an organization. Formal communication flows downward, horizontal and upward while informal communication is generally referred to as "the grapevine".

Formal communication refers to the flow of official information through proper, predefined channels and routes. The flow of information is controlled and needs deliberate effort to be properly communicated. Formal communication follows a hierarchical structure and chain of command. The structure is typically top down, from leaders in various departments and senior staff in the organization, which funnel down to lower level employees.

Informal communication, generally associated with interpersonal, horizontal communication, was primarily seen as a potential hindrance to effective organizational performance. This is no longer the case. Informal communication has become more important to ensuring the effective conduct of work in modern organizations.

Grapevine is a random, unofficial means of informal communication. It spreads through an organization with access to individual interpretation as gossip, rumors, and single-strand messages. Grapevine communication is quick and usually more direct than formal communication. An employee who receives most of the grapevine information but does not pass it onto others is known as a dead-ender. An employee that receives less than half of the grapevine information is an isolate. Grapevine can include destructive miscommunication, but it can also be beneficial by allowing feelings to be expressed, and increasing the productivity of employees.

Additionally, McPhee and Zaug (1995) take a more nuanced view of communication as constitutive of organizations (also referred to as CCO). They identify four constitutive flows of communication, formal and informal, which become interrelated in order to constitute organizing and an organization:

- organizational self-structuring
- membership negotiation
- activity coordination
- institutional positioning

== Role of organizational communication ==
Organizational communication refers to exchanging and transmitting information between individuals and groups within an organization. Communication is a central function of organizations, as the success of an organization is reliant on individuals coming together for the benefit of organizational success.

=== Understanding Organizations as People ===
........... This encompasses power struggles, team building, conflict, decision making, compliance, and all other human aspects of an organization. In early years, organizations gave little regard to the psychological needs of employees. Organizational communication considers how to motivate individuals within an organization by ensuring human needs are met in the workplace.

Modern organizational communication studies consider work-from-home and remote work structures, a phenomenon that emerged during the COVID-19 pandemic as digital communication took the forefront.

=== Effective and Ineffective Communication in Organizations ===
Organizational communication extensively covers what communication techniques are appropriate and effective in specific scenarios with a focus on effective management. Informal and formal communication are both essential to an organization’s inner workings, but must be used appropriately. Understanding effective communication techniques can be used to minimize and resolve conflict within an organization.

=== Awareness of Communication Skills ===
The field of organizational communication strives to identify and teach successful communication skills that can be applied within the organization and on a personal level. As awareness of the functions of organizational communication has increased, organizations have had an elevated need for roles that focus on organizational consulting, job training, and career development.

== Perspectives ==
Shockley-Zalabak identified the following two perspectives, essentially as ways of understanding the organizational communication process as a whole.

=== The functional tradition ===
According to Shockley-Zalabak, the functional tradition is "a way of understanding organizational communication by describing what messages do and how they move through organizations." There are different functions within this process that all work together to contribute to the overall success of the organization, and these functions occur during the repetition of communication patterns in which the members of the organization engage in. The first types of functions are message functions which are "What communication does or how it contributes to the overall functioning of the organization", and we describe message functions in three different categories which are organizational functions, relationship functions, and change functions. Organizing functions as Shockley-Zalabak states, are "Messages that establish the rules and regulations of a particular environment". These messages can include items such as newsletters or handbooks for a specific organization, that individuals can read to learn the policies and expectations for a certain company. Relationship functions are "Communication that helps individuals define their roles and assess the compatibility of individual and organizational goals". These relationship functions are a key aspect to how individuals identify with a company and it helps them develop their sense of belonging which can greatly influence their quality of work. The third and final subcategory within message functions are change functions, which are defined as "messages that help organizations adapt what they do and how they do it". Change messages occur in various choice making decisions, and they are essential to meet the employee's needs as well as have success with continual adaptations within the organization.

=== The meaning centered approach ===
According to Shockley-Zalabak, the meaning centered approach is "a way of understanding organizational communication by discovering how organizational reality is generated through human interaction". This approach is more concerned with what communication is instead of why and how it works, and message functions as well as message movement are not focused on as thoroughly in this perspective.

== Theoretical approaches ==
=== Classical ===
Emerging out of the Industrial Revolution and the increased mechanization of work, classical approaches to organizing involve a vertical flow of communication that is highly formal and often written, mostly in a downward direction. The main idea of the classical approach of organizational communication is that the theory compares organizations to a machine. The theory observed and analyze that workers perform the task they are given to in order to contribute to the overall well-being of the organization. Each member has their purpose in the group, just like a part of a machine works does its tasks while cooperate with other parts to have a well-managed, functioning machine. Additionally, just like a machine that collapse when one part fails to function. An organization will fall apart when members are not doing their designated task appropriately. Henri Fayol's work on classical management identifies five elements of management suggesting tasks for managers; planning, organizing, command, coordination, and control; and six principles of management suggesting how managers might enact the aforementioned elements of management; scalar chain, unity of command, unity of direction, division of labor, order, and span of control; relative to this approach.

=== Human relations ===
The human relation approach is based on several different theorists such as: Elton Mayo, McGregors's Douglas, Abraham Maslow, Mary Parker Follett's and Argyris. The main idea of the human relation approach of organizational communication is that the theory compares organizations to a family. As this theory compares organization to a family, it focuses on workers satisfaction and the relationship within the organizations more compared to the work performance element. The human relation approach emphasizes the importance of employee attitudes, and encourage organizations management team to focus on interpersonal relationships, group dynamics, and leadership styles in achieving organizational effectiveness. It attempts to unearth how directing attention at these areas can helps managers and other organizational actors motivative employees in order to increase productivity and organizational functioning. In using this approach, researchers commonly refer to Abraham Maslow's hierarchy of needs to aid in identifying how meeting employee's individual needs have an effect on the overall wellbeing of an organization.

=== Cultural ===
The cultural approach to organizing views organizations through a cultural lens, looking at both organizational culture and cultural influences and impacts on organizing. Scholars of cultural organizational communication attempt to identify the value and attributes of strong organizational culture in order to understand its effects on organizational functioning. Edgar Schein suggests three "levels of analysis" for interpreting organizational culture: artifacts, or the experiential elements of an organization; beliefs and values; and the implicit assumptions about and among the organization.

=== Systems ===
The systems approach to organizing views organizations as complex organisms and sees interaction with the external environmental as essential to survival. Components of this approach include hierarchical ordering, interdependence, and permeability. Processes of exchange are central to this approach; the concept of input-throughput-output identifies how this process is identified within this system.

=== Constitutive ===
The constitutive approach is an organizational communications theory originating in Robert T. Craig’s chapter of the book Communication Theory: Communication Theory as a Field. An organizational constitutive approach views communication processes as a means of forming and maintaining organizations. Ideas of communication have evolved throughout history. As a practical solution to contemporary social problems, the constitutive model is presented. For example, traditional ideas and institutions are eroding, cultural diversity and interdependence are increasing, and democratic participation in social reality is in high demand.

=== Critical ===
Critical approaches to organizational communication maintain a focus on power structures and power imbalances in regards to organizing. Critical theory is centered around the argument that power imbalances, and therefore oppression and domination, are innate parts of social structures and organizations. The critical approach seeks to identify organizational sources of power and control in order to empower groups of oppressed people. Within this approach there is a focus on ideological and hegemonic systems.

=== Feminist ===
Feminist approaches to organizational communication is a relatively new area of scholarship, originating in the 1970s. Similar to the critical approach, feminist theory highlights power relations in organizational structures and institutionalized male domination as an instrument of oppression against women. The feminist approach is intersectional, calling for the recognition of multiple perspectives of race, sexuality, and nationality. The underlying assumption in feminist organizational theory is that women generally adapt to male norms within the workplace but are still subject to female stereotypes. The feminist approach aims to identify structural and cultural barriers in the workplace and how to eliminate them.

=== Communicative rationality ===
Communicative rationality is a theory developed from the works of Jürgen Habermas, a german philosopher. The communicative rationality approach has been developed to explain why successful communication needs the use of human rationality to be effective. The theory derives from the philosophical study of universal pragmatics, which looks to understand what circumstances are needed for reaching understanding in communications.

== Conflict management ==
Conflict is experienced by all organizations, therefore strategies to mitigate its effects on the wellbeing of organizations have been developed over time by both researchers and scholars alike. Professionals solely aim to diminish any conflicts that may arise within the workplace in the most effective manner as possible. In order to do this, these employees must possess strong conflict resolution skills.

Since conflicts in the workplace typically arise in various magnitudes, it is important that they are dealt with as soon as possible. For instance, if an individual tends to leave their space consistently messy, it can disrupt the entire office and leave for a multitude of other conflicts to arise if not dealt in a timely manner. Another example is if another co-worker tends to be disruptive or raise their voice. Both instances can be related to both internal and external sources, however, must be dealt with the same sufficiency since they could become reoccurring, daily issues if not dealt with.

A leaders ability in conflict management is important. It was found that leaders who focus on collaboration have a higher success rate than those who focus on avoidant or dominating conflict behaviour. It is also important that leaders are trained correctly on conflict management before being placed on the floor.

== Research ==
=== Research methodologies ===
Historically, organizational communication was driven primarily by quantitative research methodologies. Included in functional organizational communication research are statistical analyses (such as surveys, text indexing, network mapping and behavior modeling). In the early 1980s, the interpretive revolution took place in organizational communication. In Putnam and Pacanowsky's 1983 text Communication and Organizations: An Interpretive Approach. they argued for opening up methodological space for qualitative approaches such as narrative analyses, participant-observation, interviewing, rhetoric and textual approaches readings) and philosophic inquiries.

In addition to qualitative and quantitative research methodologies, there is also a third research approach called mixed methods. "Mixed methods is a type of procedural approach for conducting research that involves collecting, analyzing, and mixing quantitative and qualitative data within a single program of study. Its rationale postulates that the use of both qualitative and quantitative research provides a better and richer understanding of a research problem than either traditional research approach alone provides." Complex contextual situations are easier to understand when using a mixed methods research approach, compared to using a qualitative or quantitative research approach. There are more than fifteen mixed method design typologies that have been identified. Because these typologies share many characteristics and criteria, they have been classified into six different types. Three of these types are sequential, meaning that one type of data collection and analysis happens before the other. The other three designs are concurrent, meaning both qualitative and quantitative data are collected at the same time.

=== Sequential explanatory design ===
To achieve results from a sequential explanatory design, researchers would take the results from analyzing quantitative data and get a better explanation through a qualitative follow up. They then interpret how the qualitative data explains the quantitative data.

=== Sequential exploratory design ===
Although sequential exploratory design may resemble sequential explanatory design, the order in which data is collected is reversed. Researchers begin with collecting qualitative data and analyzing it, then follow up by building on it through a quantitative research method. They use the results from qualitative data to form variables, instruments and interventions for quantitative surveys and questionnaires.

=== Sequential transformative design ===
Researchers in line with sequential transformative design are led by a "theoretical perspective such as a conceptual framework, a specific ideology, or an advocacy position and employs what will best serve the researcher's theoretical or ideological perspective". Therefore, with this research design, it could be either the qualitative or quantitative method that is used first and priority depends on circumstance and resource availability, but can be given to either.

=== Concurrent triangulation design ===
With a concurrent triangulation design, although data is collected through both quantitative and qualitative methods at the same time, they are collected separately with equal priority during one phase. Later, during the analysis phase, the mixing of the two methods takes place.

=== Concurrent embedded design ===
In a concurrent embedded design, again, both qualitative and quantitative data is collected, although here one method supports the other. Then, one of the two methods (either qualitative or quantitative) transforms into a support for the dominant method.

=== Concurrent transformative design ===
The concurrent transformative design allows the researcher to be guided by their theoretical perspective, so their qualitative and quantitative data may have equal or unequal priority. Again, they are both collected during one phase.

Mixed methods capitalizes on maximizing the strengths of qualitative and quantitative research and minimizing their individual weaknesses by combining both data. Quantitative research is criticized for not considering contexts, having a lack of depth and not giving participants a voice. On the other hand, qualitative research is criticized for smaller sample sizes, possible researcher bias and a lack of generalizability.

During the 1980s and 1990s critical organizational scholarship began to gain prominence with a focus on issues of gender, race, class, and power/knowledge. In its current state, the study of organizational communication is open methodologically, with research from post-positive, interpretive, critical, postmodern, and discursive paradigms being published regularly.

Organizational communication scholarship appears in a number of communication journals including but not limited to Management Communication Quarterly, International Journal of Business Communication, Journal of Applied Communication Research, Communication Monographs, Academy of Management Journal, Communication Studies, and Southern Communication Journal.

== Current research topics ==
In some circles, the field of organizational communication has moved from acceptance of mechanistic models (e.g., information moving from a sender to a receiver) to a study of the persistent, hegemonic and taken-for-granted ways in which we not only use communication to accomplish certain tasks within organizational settings (e.g., public speaking) but also how the organizations in which we participate affect us.

These approaches include "postmodern", "critical", "participatory", "feminist", "power/political", "organic", etc. and adds to disciplines as wide-ranging as sociology, philosophy, theology, psychology, business, business administration, institutional management, medicine (health communication), neurology (neural nets), semiotics, anthropology, international relations, and music.

Currently, some topics of research and theory in the field are:

Constitution, e.g.,

- How communicative behaviors construct or modify organizing processes or products?
- How communication itself plays a constitutive role in organizations?
- How the organizations within which we interact affect our communicative behaviors, and through these, our own identities?
- Structures other than organizations which might be constituted through our communicative activity (e.g., markets, cooperatives, tribes, political parties, social movements).
- When does something "become" an organization? When does an organization become (an)other thing(s)? Can one organization "house" another? Is the organization still a useful entity/thing/concept, or has the social/political environment changed so much that what we now call "organization" is so different from the organization of even a few decades ago that it cannot be usefully tagged with the same word – "organization"?

Narrative, e.g.,

- How do group members employ narrative to acculturate/initiate/indoctrinate new members?
- Do organizational stories act on different levels? Are different narratives purposively invoked to achieve specific outcomes, or are there specific roles of "organizational storyteller"? If so, are stories told by the storyteller received differently from those told by others in the organization?
- In what ways does the organization attempt to influence storytelling about the organization? under what conditions does the organization appear to be more or less effective in obtaining a desired outcome?
- When these stories conflict with one another or with official rules/policies, how are the conflicts worked out? in situations in which alternative accounts are available, who or how or why are some accepted and others rejected?

Identity, e.g.,

- Who do we see ourselves to be, in terms of our organizational affiliations?
- Do communicative behaviors or occurrences in one or more of the organizations in which we participate effect changes in us? To what extent do we consist of the organizations to which we belong?
- Is it possible for individuals to successfully resist organizational identity? what would that look like?
- Do people who define themselves by their work-organizational membership communicate differently within the organizational setting than people who define themselves more by an avocational (non-vocational) set of relationships?
- For example, researchers have studied how human service workers and firefighters use humor at their jobs as a way to affirm their identity in the face of various challenges. Others, have examined the identities of police organizations, prison guards, and professional women workers.

Interrelatedness of organizational experiences, e.g.,

- How do our communicative interactions in one organizational setting affect our communicative actions in other organizational settings?
- How do the phenomenological experiences of participants in a particular organizational setting effect changes in other areas of their lives?
- When the organizational status of a member is significantly changed (e.g., by promotion or expulsion) how are their other organizational memberships affected?
- What kind of future relationship between business and society does organizational communication seem to predict?

Power e.g.,

- How does the use of particular communicative practices within an organizational setting reinforce or alter the various interrelated power relationships within the setting? Are the potential responses of those within or around these organizational settings constrained by factors or processes either within or outside of the organization – (assuming there is an "outside")?
- Do taken-for-granted organizational practices work to fortify the dominant hegemonic narrative? Do individuals resist/confront these practices, through what actions/agencies, and to what effects?
- Do status changes in an organization (e.g., promotions, demotions, restructuring, financial/social strata changes) change communicative behavior? Are there criteria employed by organizational members to differentiate between "legitimate" (i.e., endorsed by the formal organizational structure) and "illegitimate" (i.e., opposed by or unknown to the formal power structure) behaviors? When are they successful, and what do we mean by "successful" when there are "pretenders" or "usurpers" who employ these communicative means?

Diversity, Equity, and inclusion (DEI) in organizational communication.

Research in this area covers a range of principles and practices aimed at fostering an inclusive organizational environment by leveraging effective communication strategies. DEI in the workplace encompasses a variety of personal and social bases of identity, including race-ethnicity, gender, age, socioeconomic status, religion, sexual orientation, country of origin, etc.

Research focus under DEI organizational communication includes;

- The application of different communication theories to better understand and address the diverse perspectives, backgrounds, orientations, and experiences within the workforce. - Research has focused on analyzing the composition of employee dynamics to first identify the diverse perspectives and second to understand them.
- How effective communication is pivotal in creating inclusive policies ranging from employee recruitment, retention, compensation, benefits, and retirement. - Scholars have reviewed the wording of organization policies and communicated messages to identify loopholes qualifiers that might have hindered DEI in the past.
- How implicit bias is embedded in organizational culture and practices. - Research focuses on helping employees and organizational leadership to identify their bias against minority groups through their verbal and non-verbal communication.

Research focus of race-ethnicity under DEI in the workplace includes;

- The underrepresentation of minority races in the workplace.
- Challenges that hinder underrepresented minority group members from advancing to leadership positions in the workplace.
- The emotional, social, psychological, and physical effects of the challenges that minority group members face in the workplace.

Research focus of Gender under DEI in the workplace includes;

- Challenges that women face in organizations.
- Factors that hinder women from rising to leadership positions at work.
- The stereotype against women leaders and how they have managed to succeed with workplace challenges.
- Understanding the pressure on women to work more than men to prove themselves in the workplace.
- The bias against women of color during hiring processes.
- Contrast in annual remuneration between men and women holding the same position in organizations.
- Challenges of mentoring women in organizations and how to improve.
- How effective communication can align leadership messages with organizational values and goals during the implementation of DEI.
- Challenges minority groups encounter while trying to progress in organizations.
- How effective communication strategies can foster an increase in the representation of underrepresented groups.

Further research has also focused on introducing and applying different communication theories to analyze diversity problems in the workplace and proffer solutions on improvement.

The inclusion of DEI in organizational communications research because it can lead to significant improvement in the world by proposing viable solutions to difficult problems within important social contexts.

== See also ==
- Agenda-setting theory
- Organizational learning
- Anticipatory socialization
- Socionics
- Fields of LGBTQ communication studies

=== Associations ===
- Academy of Management
- Institute of Scientific and Technical Communicators (UK)
- International Association of Business Communicators
- International Communication Association
- National Communication Association
