= Communicative Constitution of Organizations =

Communication theory

The communicative constitution of organizations (CCO) perspective is broadly characterized by the claim that communication is not something that happens within organizations or between organizational members; instead, communication is the process whereby organizations are constituted. Specifically, this view contends: “organization is an effect of communication not its predecessor." This perspective is part of a broader constitutive view of communication arguing, "elements of communication, rather than being fixed in advance, are reflexively constituted within the act of communication itself".

CCO is one of several views or metaphors of organizing, see Images of Organization and Organizing (management) for contrasting and complementary views. There are three popular branches, schools, or perspectives of the CCO:

1. McPhee & Zaug's Four Flows
2. The Montréal School
3. Luhman's Social Systems.

== Background of the perspective ==
The model of communication as constitutive of organizations has origins in the linguistic approach to organizational communication taken in the 1980s. Theorists such as Karl E. Weick were among the first to posit that organizations were not static but inherently comprised by a dynamic process of communicating.

The notion of a communicative constitution of organization comprises three schools of thought: (1) The Montreal School, (2) the McPhee's Four Flows based on Gidden's Structuration Theory, and (3), Luhmann's Theory of Social Systems. All CCO perspectives agree that “communication is the primary mode of explaining social reality”. While the Montreal School emphasizes speech acts, the four-flows highlights internal and external relations of the organization to members, members to other members, and the organization to outsiders. Luhmann contends that only decision-oriented messages allow the organization to emerge.

== McPhee & Zaug's Four Flows ==
In their seminal 2000 article, which was republished in 2009 The Communicative Constitution of Organizations: A Framework for Explanation, Robert D. McPhee and Pamela Zaug distinguish four types of communicative flows that generate a social structure through interaction. The flows, though distinct, can affect one another in the model and lead to multi-way conversation or texts typically involving reproduction of as well as resistance to the rules and resources of the organization.

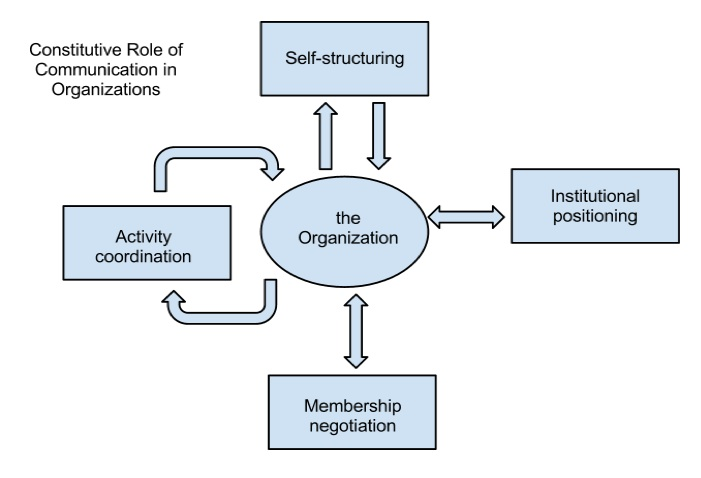
Model of the four flows or interaction processes which constitute an organization.

=== Organizational self-structuring ===
Reflexive self-structuring separates organizations from other groupings such as a crowd or mob. The self-structuring process is deliberately carried out through communication among role-holders and groups. Communication regarding self-structuring is recursive and dialogic in nature. It concerns the control, design, and documentation of an organization's relations, norms, processes, and entities. Communication of formal structure predetermines work routines rather than allowing them to emerge and controls the collaboration and membership-negotiation processes. Physical examples of organizational self-structuring include a charter, organizational chart, and policy manual.

Organizational self-structuring is a political, subjective process that can be affected by systems, individuals, interests, and traditions in which it takes place. It is not necessarily free of error or ambiguity. To constitute an organization, the communication must imply the formation and governance of a differentiated whole with its own reflexive response cycle and mechanisms.

=== Membership negotiation ===
Organizations are necessarily composed of, yet are distinct from, individual members. Because humans are not inherently members of organizations, negotiatory communication must occur to incorporate them. Membership negotiation links an organization to its members by establishing and maintaining relationships. Practices in membership negotiation include job recruitment and socialization. In recruitment, potential members are evaluated, both parties must agree to a relationship, and the member must be incorporated into the structure of the organization. The negotiation process can be influenced by powers including prior existence and supervision, and all parties involved may redefine themselves to fit expectations. Among higher status members, power-claiming and spokesmanship are examples of negotiation processes to gain resources of an organization.

=== Activity coordination ===
Activity coordination is a result of the fact that organizations inherently have at least one purpose to which the members' activity is contributing. Often an organization's self-structuring defines the division of labor, work flow sequences, policies, etc. that set the course for activity coordination. The structure is reflexively changing and may not be complete, relevant, fully understood, or free of problems. Therefore, a necessity of communication arises among members to amend and adjust the work process. Activity coordination can include adjusting the work process and resolving immediate or unforeseen practical problems.

Activity coordination operates on the assumption that members are working in an interdependent social unit beyond the work tasks themselves. It incorporates any processes and attitudes and therefore includes coordination for members to not complete work or to seek power over one another. The work of Dr. Henry Mintzberg exemplifies activity coordination in the mechanism of mutual adjustment in his theory of organizational forms. In this example, co-workers informally coordinate work arounds for issues on the job.

=== Institutional positioning ===
Institutional positioning links the organization to the environment outside the organization at a macro level. Examples of entities outside the organization include suppliers, customers, and competitors. Communication outside the organization negotiates terms of recognition of the organization’s existence and place in what is called "identity negotiation" or "positioning". Often the communicators of this message are individuals who concurrently negotiate their own relationships but messages can come from the greater organization as a whole.

Though there is not one configuration that an organization must embody, in order to be considered by peer institutions, the minimum process involves negotiating inclusion in the environment. Organizations must establish and maintain a presence, image, status, and a two-way communication channel with partners. Objects such as organizational charts can assert a particular image and demonstrate legitimacy. Organizations which are marginalized due to their lack of institutional positioning include startup companies and illegal groups such as the Mafia. Generally, the more secure an organization, the stronger relationships and control over uncertainty and resources it has in its environment. Pre-existing institutional (corporations, agencies), political, legal, cultural, etc. structures allow for easier constitution of complex organizations.

== The Montréal School ==
One of the most distinctive stances of the Montreal School approach, birthed in the Université de Montréal by James Taylor, Francois Cooren (see particularly Cooren, 2004), and Bruno Latour amongst others, is that texts have agency. Texts do something to humans that is not reducible to certain human interactions and human actions.

The Montreal flavor of CCO is exemplified by Taylor et al. (1996) and the volume edited by Cooren, Taylor, and Van Emery (2006). The Montréal school foregrounds process of coorientation, or the orientation of two individuals to one another, and the object of conversation. Cooren, Kuhn, Cornelissen, and Clark (2011) suggest that coorientation occurs when individuals focus on each other and the multitudes of agencies within the organizational environment. Cooren et al. (2011), the current leading voice in the Montréal school, suggests that Greimas language theory (described by Cooren & Taylor, 2006 as almost incomprehensible) and Latour’s (1995, 2005) Actor Network Theory are the basis of the Montréal school’s thinking. Taylor and Van Every (2001) rely on Austin’s (1962) and Searle’s (1975) Speech Act Theory.

Two central terms to the Montréal school are derived from Austin’s work on language: text and conversation. The text represents big ‘D’ Discourse in the organization, or the way people talk, while conversation represents the messages exchanged between two parties that solidify into text. In this way, Taylor et al. (1996) claim that organizations are not real in the material sense; instead, organizations are a culmination of conversations and texts. Further, Taylor et al. (1996) suggest that organizations always speak through an agent. Over the course of time, distanciation, or solidification of various texts lead to what laypeople refer to as the organization, occurs.

Taylor et al. (1996) propose several degrees of separation between text and conversation. First, text is translated into action through the ability of communication to carry intention. Second, conversation turns into a narrative representation as interlocutors agree on meaning. Third, text is translating into (semi)permanent medium; for example, we write down regulations in an employee handbook. Such medium permits storage of texts to help them become conversation. Fourth, these media specialize the language as professionalism. Fifth, physical and material structures are created by the organization to perpetuate conversation. Finally, publication, dissemination, diffusion, and other forms of broadcast are employed to convey the message created by members of the organization. Through this CCO process, the social arrangements of the workplace become codified. The Montréal school’s proponents contend that the essence of organizing is captured in the submission, imbrication, and embeddedness of text and conversation (Schoeneborn et al., 2014).

Several other key terms are related with the Montréal school: coorientation (Taylor, 2009), plenum of agencies (Cooren, 2006), closure (Cooren & Fairhurst, 2004), hybridity (Castor & Cooren, 2006), imbrication (Taylor, 2011), and most recently ventriloquism (Cooren et al. 2013). Coorientation, as described above is an A-B-X relationship between two actors and an object; the object can be psychological, physical, or social. A plenum of agencies refers to the potential of both human and non-human actants (a term borrowed from Actor Network Theory; Latour, 1995) to interact within the organizational environment. Closure is the punctuation of conversations to provide deeper understanding by interlocutors. Hybridity refers to human and nonhuman actants working together to co-orient a claim. Imbrication refers to the emerging structures created by discourse in the organization over time that become an unquestioned part of what we call the organization. Finally, ventriloquism is the study of how interacts (both human and non-human) position and are positioned by the need to act via different values, principles, interests, norms, experiences, and other structures.

== Luhmann's Social Systems ==
Luhmann's systems theory focuses on three topics, which are interconnected in his entire work:

1. Systems theory as societal theory
2. Communication theory and
3. Evolution theory

The core element of Luhmann's theory is communication. Social systems are systems of communication, and society is the most encompassing social system. Being the social system that comprises all (and only) communication, today's society is a world society. A system is defined by a boundary between itself and its environment, dividing it from an infinitely complex, or (colloquially) chaotic, exterior. The interior of the system is thus a zone of reduced complexity: Communication within a system operates by selecting only a limited amount of all information available outside. This process is also called "reduction of complexity". The criterion according to which information is selected and processed is meaning (in German, Sinn). Both social systems and psychical or personal systems (see below for an explanation of this distinction) operate by processing meaning.

The third strand of CCO was first acknowledged by Taylor (1995) but has only recently been included as a strand of CCO theorizing. Luhmann (1995) claims that individuals do not create meaning, instead all meaning comes from social systems. Perhaps this is why Luhmann’s general system perspective has only recently been considered a part of the CCO body of scholarship. Luhmann takes care to define communication as a tripartite conceptualization of interactive forces. Specifically, Seidl (2014) explains that Luhmann suggests communication is an amalgam of information, utterance, and understanding. Whereas information is what is contained in a message, utterance is how the communication is conducted, and understanding “refers to the distinction between information and utterance” (p. 290). Luhmann’s perspective is a radical departure from traditional communication scholarship. Putnam and Fairhurst (2015) explain that the Luhmannian perspective is wholly communicative; that is, meaning is complete up to utterances in a given communicative interaction.

Luhmann’s perspective gives less value to human agency in favor of a social agentic perspective. For this reason, Seidl claims that CCO research using Luhmann’s version should focus on communication not on actors. Human agency is minimized by this perspective. Psychic systems (i.e., the mind) interact with social systems (i.e., an organic conglomerate of multiple psychic systems) and human actors are not relevant to the constitution of organizations.

== Similarities in CCO Perspectives ==
Six premises are shared by each CCO perspective.

Premise 1 is that CCO scholarship looks at communication events. Any “turn of talk, discourse, artifact, metaphor, architectural element, body, text or narrative” is potentially important in producing and reproducing the organization.

Premise 2 is that CCO scholarship includes any communicative act in the analysis of organizational communication. That is, macro and micro communication matter in constituting the organization. Scholars broadly as “the ongoing, dynamic, interactive process of manipulating symbols toward the creation, maintenance, destruction and/or transformation of meanings which are axial—not peripheral—to organizational existence and organizing phenomena”

Premise 3 is that CCO acknowledges the co-constructed/co-oriented nature of communication. Communication is not an individual experience it is an inherently social phenomenon. Meaning is an ongoing, updating, and always social process.

Premise 4 is that the agent of action (both human and non-human) remains an open question. CCO theory embraces the ability of artifacts to shape the actions of members of the organization. For example, McPhee and Iverson (2009) explore how a communidad in Mexico was able take action against entities threatening land use; in this example, both humans and cattle affect who can own land and how it is used by such an unusual organization.

Premise 5 is that CCO scholarship does not extend beyond the realm of communication events. This premise suggests what CCO is not:

“Something as material and (apparently) inert as a building, for instance, participates in the constitution of an organization through what it does: sheltering operations, channeling activities, impressing visitors, communicating some specific values, norms, and ideologies… Paraphrasing the two Jameses (Dewey and Taylor) it is in communication that such figures will make a difference (or not) through the way their action is negotiated, imposed or debated.”

Premise 6 is that CCO favors neither organizing nor organization. That is, in the words of Putnam and Fairhurst (2015), organizations are not just continually becoming they are grounded in action. Further, these premises do not privilege any particular methodology and instead focus on an ontological and epistemological claim.

== See also ==
- Communication studies
- Models of communication
- Organizational communication
