= W. Charles Redding =

W. Charles Redding (April 13, 1914 – June 10, 1994) is credited as being the "father" of organizational communication. Redding played a significant role in both the creation and study of the field of Organizational Communication. Redding described communication as "referring to the behaviors of human beings, or the artifacts created by human beings, which result in messages being received by one or more persons."

== History ==
Redding was born on April 13, 1914, in Colorado Springs, Colorado. Throughout his life, Redding attended schools in Grand Junction, Colorado Springs, Denver, Jersey City and in Los Angeles. He earned two degrees from the University at Denver and a doctorate from the University of Southern California. Growing up, Redding had a passion for integrating Latin and logic ideas into his work, whether it was in one of his many speeches or papers. During an interview, Redding confessed that while attending the University of Denver, he had taken only one undergraduate course in speech communication and argumentation. After completing graduate school, taking courses more in psychology than in communication, Redding started teaching. Within his first six years he taught a lot of literature and composition courses. Redding was even an instructor of communication skills for the Navy- Marine officer training program. Throughout his early career, Redding saw the importance and the application of speech and communication in organizations. According to Redding, speech communication started as a skill-based work geared toward personal effectiveness and moved into theoretical issues and social science methods. From 1955 until retirement in 1979 he was a professor in the Speech (later Communication) department at Purdue University.

== Work ==
W. Charles Redding has been accredited for being one of the first people in the 1950s to develop organizational communication into a field of study within universities and as a departmental major. At that time, the field of interest was becoming known as "business speech" and "industrial communication." Departments at schools such as Northwestern University, Ohio State University, University of Southern California, and Purdue University were developing their departments in industrial communication. Redding believed that the academic development of the field was as result of things such as a NASA-sponsored conference on organizational communication and the development of the Organizational Communication Division of the International Communication Association.

Through Charles' perspective, communication is the focus of the message exchange processes that define characteristics of organizational communication as a practice and discipline. He used the term, communication, to "refer to those behaviors of human beings, or those artifacts created by human beings, which result in messages being received by one or more persons."

=== Postulates ===
In what can be considered the first reputable textbook in the field of Organizational Communication, Communication Within an Organization: The Interpretive Review of Theory and Research, Redding discusses Ten Postulates of Organizational Communication.

1. Meanings are not transferred: This postulate refers more to the receptiveness of the receivers. If a message was not received correctly Redding refers to that as content fallacy. With the concept of content fallacy the sender believes that they are getting through to the receiver just because they, the sender, understand the message that is being sent.
2. Anything is a potential message: This postulate includes both verbal and non verbal cues and messages being received as a message.
3. Input (specifically listening): In his novel, Redding discusses how to be a good listener. He utilizes the example of a participative manager listening to his subordinates in an empathetic manner.
4. The message that is received is the one that will bring action: The message that is sent and received is the one that will be acted up on. Redding states that the receiver will reference their personal experiences as a point of reference to act up on the message received.
5. Feedback (Responsiveness and Receptiveness): This postulate deals with feedback within an organization from both managers and subordinates. Feedback receptiveness refers to how much feedback managers welcome from subordinates. Responsiveness refers to how much feedback managers give. Redding also notes that there is a difference between being open, responding, and being receptive to feedback are three separate things.
6. Cost Factor: Communication requires energy. Redding discusses the formula: efficiency = effectiveness/cost. Ultimately, more communication does not equal more effectiveness.
7. Redundancy: This postulates deals with the repetition of messages and how effective and comprehensive the messages are.
8. Communication Overload: This postulate deals with an individual's limit of processing messages. Messages may not be properly received if too many messages or noise is interfering with reception of messages.
9. Serial Transmission Effect: This postulate refers to change of meaning within a message. This can occur when information is traveling through various people within a network. Messages are liable to get distorted.
10. Organization's Climate: Redding believed that an organization's climate was far more important than its skills or techniques. He even theorized an "Ideal Managerial Climate" which consisted of 5 parts.
  a. Supportiveness
  b. Participative decision making
  c. Trust, confidence, and credibility
  d. Openness and candor
  e. Emphasis on high performance goals.

In this same book, Redding supports these postulates with research from various studies. He was an avid believer in investigating messages and message related practices.

== The Redding Tradition ==
The Redding Tradition of scholarship shows the progression of organizational communication from its earliest beginnings as industrial communication and presentational skills to the contemporary framing of organizations as empirical instantiations of interpretive processes. For years, Redding gathered this information through quantitative investigations constructed to improve organizational practice.

The Redding Tradition essentially began because Redding believed that communication could positively change workplace practices. It is believed that Redding saw the conceptual and pragmatic benefits of a field that could speak to different audiences' concerns, understand fundamental communication processes through a variety of data sources and methods, and be committed to helping shape a rapidly changing organizational lifeworld.

=== Themes ===
Four themes are characteristic of the Redding Tradition of scholarship. They represent belief in: (1) Human progress through empirical investigations; (2) The power of critique; (3) Message exchange as the core of organizational communication; and (4) The need to understand the socio-historical and diverse theoretical underpinnings of organizational communication.

1. Human progress through empirical investigations: This stands as a keystone of the Redding Tradition. Redding believed, most simply, that humans could make much headway through the study of organizational communication merely by looking deeper into it. He believed that such progress could be made through a number of values. They are: change and progress, effort and optimism, efficiency, practicality and pragmatism, and science and secular rationality. Redding believed that a solid amount of positivity in all of these values could lead to an inevitable growth in everyone's knowledge of organizational communication.
2. The power of critique: Redding found value in the critical analysis of the fundamentals of communication. In fact, his requirement for organizational and managerial communication scholars was that they should question everything. Redding even criticized communication editors in 1985 for not challenging the assumptions of organizational life. He was thoroughly against contentment in promoting organizational values without sufficient critique. In short, he felt that active questioning was a focal point in usefully progressing the study of organizational communication.
3. Message exchange as the core of organizational communication: According to Redding, communication meant "those behaviors of human beings, or those artifacts created by human beings, which result in messages being received by one or more persons. Redding felt there was no doubting the power of message exchange in organizational communication, implying that there would be no organization if not for the communication.
4. Need to understand the Socio-Historical and Diverse Theoretical Underpinnings of Our Discipline: Redding preached that, in a field where many felt the future was unpredictable, the only effective way to prepare for the future was to look at the past and utilize similar techniques.

== Scholarships and awards ==
Even before his death in 1994, there have been many awards and scholarships created honoring Redding's work in the fields of Organizational Communication and Education, and encouraging others to follow in his footsteps.

=== Redding Dissertation Award ===
This award, presented by Division 4 of the International Communication Association, is an annual competition for the best dissertation in the United States, relating to the field of Organizational Communications. The best dissertation receives a cash prize as well as certificates for the winning student, and their professor. The criteria for the winning dissertation, according to the International Communication Association must be "theoretically driven, methodologically rigorous, and make a significant contribution to [the] field. In the spirit of Redding, the dissertation should present ideas that advance our understanding of organizing and communicating, and that make a difference in the lives of organizational members."

== Sources ==
- Tompkins, Phillip K. "W. Charles Redding." Spectra Sep. 1994: 2+. Communication & Mass Media Complete. EBSCO. <https://libdatabase.newpaltz.edu/login?url=http://search.ebscohost.com/login.aspx?direct=true&db=ufh&AN=15359287&site=ehost-live>.
- Patrice M Buzzanell, Cynthia Stohl. (1999). The Redding tradition of organizational communication scholarship: W. Charles Redding and his legacy. Communication Studies, 50(4), 324–336. Retrieved from Platinum Periodicals database. (Document ID: 63320554).
- Jablin, F. M., & Putnam, L. L. (2001). The New Handbook of Organizational Communication: Advances in Theory, Research, and Methods. Thousand Oaks: Sage Publications.
- Patrice M Buzzanell, Cynthia Stohl. (1999). The Redding tradition of organizational communication scholarship: W. Charles Redding and his legacy. Communication Studies, 50(4), 324–336. Retrieved from Platinum Periodicals database. (Document ID: 63320554).
- Huseman, R. C. (1973, Vol. 10, No. 3, 52–53). Review of Communication Within the Organization. The Journal of Business Communication . Georgia, United States: University of Georgia.
- Kreps, G. L. (1986). Organizational Communication. White Plains: Longman Inc.
- Papa, M. J., Daniels, T. D., & Spiker, B. K. (2008). Organizational Communication: Perspectives and Trends. Thousand Oaks: Sage Publications.
- Redding, W. C. (1972). Communication Within the Organization. New York: Industrial Communication and Purdue University.
- Motley, M. (1990, Winter1990). On Whether One Can(not) Not Communicate: An Examination via Traditional Communication Postulates. Western Journal of Speech Communication: WJSC, 54(1), 1-20. Retrieved from Communication & Mass Media Complete database.
- Nimmo, D. (1979). Communication Yearbook 3. New Brunswick: International Communication Association.
