= Interpretive discussion =

Discussion exploring meaning of a text

An interpretive discussion is a discussion in which participants explore and/or resolve interpretations often pertaining to texts of any medium containing significant ambiguity in meaning.

== Education ==
Interpretive discussions are an effective pedagogical method throughout educational systems in classes of nearly every subject and grade. A major goal of pedagogical interpretive discussions is for students to delve deeply into texts in order to better understand their meanings. Pedagogical interpretive discussions typically culminate with syntheses of arguments presented, engaging students in critical thinking as they infer meaning from texts, formulate personal opinions, respectfully argue for their own interpretations and synthesize arguments. Over the course of discussions, participants benefit from cognitive exercise as well as communication and social relationship skill-building. Cognitive skills developed include inquiry, critical thinking, reflective thinking, metacognition, reading comprehension, text inferencing, pragmatic competence and metalinguistic awareness.

In the United States, the Common Core State Standards Initiative English Language Arts Standards "require that all students learn to make interpretations of texts. The standards insist that students be able to comprehend what is stated explicitly in a text, infer what follows logically from explicit statement, and make arguments based upon textual evidence to support those inferences — i.e., interpret a text for themselves. In addition, students are expected to be able to engage in conversation about the meaning of texts with others whose perspectives and backgrounds may differ from their own. The exchanges are to be 'collaborative', meaning that students will work together to develop ideas — 'building on one another's' — and state their views clearly."

=== Leading interpretive discussions ===
Successful leaders of interpretive discussions should be involved with the ideas and opinions that their students express. This involves both being familiar with the texts and developing lists of questions to use as possible jumping points for discussions as well as getting participants involved throughout the processes of discussions. Successful leaders also come to discussions with open minds as to the outcomes or endpoints of discussions. Leaders must listen to discussants, acting as facilitators and not as authorities.

Before discussions, leaders should carefully select readings and communicate expectations to participants. This ensures that participants will have adequate time to prepare and to understand the expectations for discussions such as expected attendance at discussions, frequency of participation and proper ways to disagree respectfully with other participants.

In some discussion models, participants are expected to come to discussions prepared with their own lists of questions about texts, to encourage independent thinking. Interpretive discussions can arise or flow from participants' questions; discussants can be genuinely motivated to participate as well as to engage with texts so as to better understand the meanings of texts. That is, no questions need be thrust upon groups for discussions, but rather interested discussants can participate actively to better understand the meanings of texts. In other discussion models (often those with more limited time), leaders guide participants through questions to ensure that important topics are covered over the course of discussions.

In leading discussions, leaders should encourage every member of the discussion to participate. Some consider that this includes calling on participants who are habitually quiet, even when they do not volunteer, to try to engage them in discussions and to encourage them to share their opinions and interpretations. As leaders, it is also important to remember that "one of the most important things an instructor can do to promote student participation in discussion is to maintain a respectful posture toward students and their contributions." By treating participants and their questions and interpretations respectfully, leaders will encourage participants to continue to participate and to take risks.

Leaders of discussions should also encourage participants to engage more deeply with texts by asking probing follow-up questions, asking for specific passages in texts as support and by summarizing what participants have said and asking if participants want to clarify. In this way, leaders of discussions act as facilitators. Finally, discussion leaders are responsible for providing conclusions or wrap ups to discussions, asking for final questions or clarifications and providing contexts for discussions.

=== Discussion questions ===
Interpretive questions may have one or many valid answers. Participants in interpretive discussions are asked to interpret various aspects of texts or to hypothesize about intended interpretations using text-based evidence. Other types of discussion questions include fact-based and evaluative questions. Fact-based questions tend to have one valid answer and can involve recall of texts or specific passages. Evaluative questions ask discussion participants to form responses based on experiences, opinions, judgments, knowledge and/or values rather than texts.

Basic or focus questions are interpretive questions which comprehensively address an aspect of interpreting a selection. Resolving basic or focus questions typically requires investigation and examination of multiple passages within a selection. Cluster questions, which need not be interpretive questions, are optionally prepared by discussion leaders and are often organized to help to resolve the answers to basic or focus questions. Cluster questions may additionally serve as catalysts for further discussions.

== See also ==
- Semantics
- Pragmatics
- Communication studies
- Hermeneutics
- Philology
- Philosophy of language
- Artificial intelligence
