= Fields of LGBTQ communication studies =

Across LGBTQ communication studies, there are many fields that research and teach about LGBTQ+ communication. LGBTQ+ communication studies researches have examined sex, sexuality, and gender identity across interpersonal relationships, families, small groups, organizations, intercultural and international contexts, rhetoric and society, performance studies and narratives, and media studies.

== LGBTQ+ interpersonal communication ==
Interpersonal communication is process of communicating between two people, which can be by verbal and nonverbal channels. Interpersonal communication includes both personal relationships and professional relationships. In LGBTQ+ relationships, these dynamics can include dating, marriage, friendship, peers, and supervisor/subordinate relationships. LGBTQ+ interpersonal communication also focuses on disabled queer and trans people's relationships and voice at work. LGBTQ+ individuals engage in communication practices that challenge heteronormativity within their interpersonal relationships. By navigating and researching these interpersonal relationships, scholars and practitioners can explore intimacy, commitment, and family structures.

=== LGBTQ+ dating and communication ===
Interpersonal communication research involves navigating various challenges related to identity, disclosure, and making connection. Researchers have found that for individuals in LGBTQ+ communities, dating apps have become a primary way for gaining connections. Platforms like Grindr are not only used to find romantic partners but also with helping in seeking social support. A study found that the use of dating apps "helped strengthen the feeling of having a gay neighborhood". Digital media platforms are important for gay communities and relationship building in various parts of the world, such as in China. Interpersonal communication is significantly influenced by stressors within only the LGBTQ+ communities, including societal discrimination, stigmas, and internalized negative beliefs. Communication studies research shows that offline and online harassment affect LGBTQ+ community members, and the use of LGBTQ+ Facebook groups may serve as a factor.

Researchers also investigate how trans individuals engage interpersonal dating communication through safer sex talks with their partners when they feel safe enough to do so. Scholarship has shown that transgender people who engage in safe sex talks with their partner also engage in safe sex practices like using a condom and dental dams.

=== LGBTQ+ marriage and communication ===
Interpersonal communication scholars examine how same-sex couples manage privacy from not only society but also from their families. Navigating privacy affects the overall relationships of these couples including issues with intimacy and trust and support within their own relationship and family relationships. LGBTQ+ individuals may withhold information about their marriage out of fear of lack of understanding from in their interpersonal relationships with their family such as parents or siblings. LGBTQ+ people learn how to navigate communicating with their families while still trying to foster intimacy and connection in their marriage. Within LGBTQ+ marriages, spouses have to navigate communicating with their larger family individually and also together as a couple. In their marriages, research shows that LGBTQ+ people often create their own families as well, and within these families, they encounter unique obstacles like discrimination, legal issues, barriers to accessing to benefits, and overall societal critiques of their marriage.

=== LGBTQ+ friendship and communication ===
Friendships are made through communication, and creating friendships is important for members of the LGBTQ community. Interpersonal communication researchers look at how social media platforms provide ways for queer communities to establish friendships and connections. Types of connections range from dating opportunities, casual hookups, mental/physical support, and safety. Research shows that LGBTQ+ people use social media apps for establishing safe connections with others, including sites such as Gaydar and Gay.com. Another study recommended LGBTQ+ people remain cautious when using social media apps, especially when some can be victims of catfishing or harassment.

Language is also another way that LGBTQ+ people build friendships through communication to form their own way of communicating with one another that others may not understand. Researchers have found that there are many terms that have their own definitions; terms such as SNAP or Playful Putdowns can be used as a safety measure to defend LGBTQ+ people from mental and physical assault. This study showed that LGBTQ+ people feel safe when gender and sexuality terms are spoken by others who speak the language.

Communicating friendship can be distinct in different LGBTQ+ groups. Research on gay male friendship circles found that communicating vibrant personalities and through putting on drag performances, gay men can gain the attention of a potential friend. A study also found that friendship and inclusion was created by not only LGBTQ+ people but also heterosexuals and cisgender people who respected someone's pronouns and creating more gender inclusive spaces. For example, youth summer camps can create safe spaces including inclusive bathrooms, sorting by age, and providing name tags with pronouns to help LGBTQ+ youth connect.

=== LGBTQ+ peer bullying ===
Interpersonal communication scholars have researched LGBTQ+ bullying by peers in schools and universities, which has been a reoccurring issue throughout the United States and the globe. The data gathered from the GLSEN (Gay, Lesbian, and Straight Education Network) and HRC (Human Rights Campaign) surveys show that LGBTQ+ youth experience being bullied and having to deal with rules and regulations that are biased against them. These things not only hurt students' grades, but they also harm the way they feel and their lives.

Studies have shown LGBTQ+ bullying in schools and universities lacks a structure for change to create safer and more supportive environments for all students, regardless of their sexual orientation or gender identity. Communication researchers have proposed a solution for LGBTQ+ peer bullying: to promote innovative communication approaches, such as educator training. Researchers have also emphasized how crucial it is to establish inclusive settings and question cultural norms that support bullying behaviors. GSAs (Gay Straight Alliances) can support and speak up for LGBTQ+ students and make schools less intimidating for LGBTQ+ students.

=== LGBTQ+ supervisor and subordinate communication ===
Research demonstrates that communication between LGBTQ+ employees and their supervisors and subordinates has an impact on their interpersonal relationships, which are crucial to employee satisfaction in organizations. When studying LGBTQ+ relationships at work, research has shown that through verbal indicators like recognizing LGBTQ+ support in discussions, bringing up LGBTQ+ events, and using preferred pronouns, supervisors can convey their intentions of support as allies. A systematic literature review on LGBTQ+ workers in communication studies research highlighted the importance for managers and coworkers to support LGBTQ+ inclusive policies in practice for LGBTQ+ workers' safety and support and to retain queer and trans employees. Others investigate the complex processes by which LGBTQ+ employees choose if a coworker is an ally.

== LGBTQ+ family communication ==
Family communication are the interactions within a family that influence behaviors and relationships. It is how family members share information, express feelings, and resolve conflicts; it shapes both personal and social development within the families for the individuals. Within the context of LGBTQ+ family communication, research has found that family can be defined more expansively to include ties that are selected and marked by acceptance, love, and support rather than just biological or married criteria. According to a qualitative study that was captured in an interactive art project during a Pride festival, LGBTQ+ people and their allies typically view family through the prism of unconditional love and acceptance rather than traditional familial relationships.

=== LGBTQ+ parent-child communication ===
LGBTQ+ family communication scholarship focuses on parent-child communication, which are the interactions within a family that shape children's experiences and influence their lives through different types of conversations. Parent's view of their child after they come out as lesbian, gay, bisexual, or transgender is important to parent-child communication. Parent's understanding of their child's communicated perspective-taking (CPT), which is the process of viewing someone's situation from their perspective, while their child is in the process of coming out and viewing the themes from each story, helps to make connections; positive well-being is connected to themes like casual acceptance, offering help, and admitting difficulties.

In LGBTQ+ families, researchers found that parents could evaluate family dynamics, bust myths, grieve the loss of a heterosexual family paradigm (the ideal that heterosexual families are the only "right" standard in society), and build a welcoming family atmosphere for LGBTQ+ children. This work emphasizes the evolving social perspectives on queer identities and emphasizes the significance of establishing environments that are affirming and supportive for LGBTQ+ adolescents and their families. LGBTQ+ parenting remains understudied in communication studies compared to other areas of LGBTQ+ Communication Studies.

=== LGBTQ+ coming out communication in families ===
In family communication literature, "coming out" is often examined as an important act of communication that has the power to alter family dynamics, impacting an individual's identity as well as their relationship ties with their family. Parental rejection, after coming out, leads to the weakening of identity development in young men who identify as gay according to past research, which then heightens feelings of shame and detachment. Romantic relationships may offer a reparative influence on their self-esteem and identity acceptance in replacement of that loss of family acceptance.

Other researchers examine when it is a parent coming out to their child. Lesbian parents identified crucial dialogues for family identity with their children, coming out, dealing with society's opinions, and hosting commitment ceremonies. This open dialogue helps to foster and reinforce a sense of belonging despite societal opinions and bring open communication for the family early on. Children's reactions to their parents' coming out as lesbian or gay can be both negative and positive initially, and research found that parents' coming out communication process leads to better understanding and emotional support in families. To create open dialogue, they found that emphasizing the intricacy and varying nature of children's emotional and verbal responses built a better overall family communication style between parent and child.

=== LGBTQ+ adoption and communication ===
Researchers in family communication analyze how same sex adoptive parents are faced with the heteronormative attitudes towards sexuality (that heterosexuality is the only normal way to parent) like communicating with adoption agencies that prioritize heterosexual family structures. In LGBTQ+ adoption and communication research, same sex parents are subject to more judgements and social pressures from society. For instance, when starting school, children of LGBTQ+ parents face higher feelings of exclusion than their peers, and LGBTQ+ adoptive parents must negotiate misconceptions about the LGBTQ+ community in their communication.

Communication research has found that LGBTQ+ adoptive parents and families can be deemed as a "bad parent" due to historical views on family based on public misinformation that LGBTQ+ parents raise adopted children to be gay as well. These assumptions come from notions of reproduction and what the heterosexual world views on what makes a family according to research. Scholars have argued that communicating new meanings of family is important for LGBTQ+ families to feel included in society. Adoptive children reported having questioned their family history during teenage years, and a lot of times adoptive parents do not have access to that information.

=== Communicating LGBTQ+ chosen families ===
In LGBTQ+ communities, chosen families are common and serve as a crucial support system that has prompted researchers to look into how these families are created and communicated. Chosen family is a term used to describe families that are created voluntarily rather than being connected biologically. LGBTQ+ family and organizational communication research has examined how chosen families are communicated. Due to isolation transgender and nonbinary people face from their birth families, research has investigated how nonprofit organizations can create chosen families with trans community members to create connections and a sense of belonging in new communities. In LGBTQ+ communities, having a "chosen family" is common among individuals who are frequently disapproved of by their blood relatives.

== LGBTQ+ organizational communication ==
LGBTQ+ organizing affects the way queer and trans people communicate with each other and others. LGBTQ+ organizational communication investigates how queer and trans people communicate their experiences at work and whether or not they face certain injustices because of it. LGBTQ+ organizational communication research also includes policies that relate to LGBTQ+ people like workplace discrimination and disclosure. Researchers study the communication between LGBTQ+ community members who are working towards a common goal within an organizational setting, such as workplaces, nonprofits, and student groups.

=== LGBTQ+ workers' communication ===
Researchers look at LGBTQ+ workers when studying LGBTQ+ communication to better understand the policies that negatively or positively impact queer and transgender workers. Researchers analyze how LGBTQ+ employees are treated in the workplace, especially regarding traditional family values and expectations. LGBTQ+ workers face a dilemma when posting on social media, especially when deciding to be out or closeted on their personal accounts. Participants discussed the challenge of communicating themselves as "professional" and a question of why LGBTQ+ lifestyles are considered to be "inappropriate" for work.

Trans communication studies and rhetoric scholars also discuss challenges transgender and nonbinary people have with gendered expectations of professionalism in work settings. Many workplaces have strictly binary gendered "clothing rules" for their workplace, meaning that women are expected to wear "stylish, well-cut, and fitted" clothes, while men most wear suits. Professionals that identify as gender-nonconforming, nonbinary, or trans are often deemed less professional for wearing clothes that they feel comfortable in.

=== Communicating LGBTQ+ organizational policies ===
There are many policies that prevent LGBTQ+ workers from expressing their sexuality or gender at work. In the United States, some states that have policies and laws that do not protect LGBTQ+ people from workplace discrimination. This impacts their wages, the way they are treated in the workplace, their potential for promotion and hiring, as well as decreases their job satisfaction. Communication research on the United States military studied the "Don't Ask, Don't Tell" policy until 2010 that kept people enlisted in the military from being open about their sexuality. In academic settings like schools, colleges, and universities, disclosure of sexuality becomes difficult for many teachers and professors at work. Many factors such as race, age, and gender can also impact how a LGBTQ+ teacher disclosure is received and helps teachers determine if it is safe to communicate about their sexuality and/or gender identity.

=== LGBTQ+ nonprofit organizing and communication ===
Although Facebook has a powerful influence for nonprofit organizations, researchers have analyzed the availability and ease of finding LGBTQ+ nonprofit organizations through the popular social media site. Nonprofit organizations utilize social media to advocate for and promote their LGBTQ+ advocacy and challenge anti-LGBTQ+ policies according to research.

Organizational communication research has also investigated an LGBTQ+ blog in China that looks through a co-cultural theory analysis and researches the types of communication within this blog. This nonprofit organization discusses a notable differences between gay liberation and oppression in the United States and in China, and how sexuality and gender identity expression may contrast the main religions in China. Because of potential religious oppression, they use blogs to communicate and support each other.

=== LGBTQ+ student organizational communication ===
Organizational communication research investigates how LGBTQ+ students seek ways to create a sense of community and belonging through the implementation of clubs and organizations within their school campus. In the late 1990s, a study found that gay groups were denied recognition by their university because people feared that gay student organizations would "corrupt" the morals of their fellow students attending the university. Gay and lesbian students were not able to organize, be recognized by the university, or practice the act of associating with fellow gay and lesbian students until after the 1972 court case of Healy v. James. Universities denying the official recognition of gay and lesbian organizations made it difficult for gay and lesbian students to create a sense of community or belonging.

Communication research has found that students join LGBTQ+ organizations within their school's campus to find a place away from the outside judgments from fellow students and concerns of acceptance at home. This creates and maintains a culture of inclusion within an educational setting can create a safe space for LGBTQ+ students. Scholarship has found that the main activities within these LGBTQ+ on-campus organizations were conversations with school staff, faculty, and fellow students so that LGBTQ+ students could voice their wants, needs, and opinions.

Researchers found that it is important to maintain LGBTQ+ student organizations even when tensions arise. Communication scholars have researched the responses from universities, individuals outside LGBTQ+ student organizations, and individuals outside the LGBTQ+ student community can vary. LGBTQ+ student-led organizations tend to think of the organization as a community regardless of the tensions they experience.

=== LGBTQ+ sex work and communication ===
Researchers across fields have examined sex work and advocacy for sex workers, including sex workers' rights. The limited communication studies research on LGBTQ+ sex work has examined how it is criminalized, the potential of legalization, and the shutdowns the workers face. Scholars have also examined the impact of COVID-19 on sex work, as it has moved to mostly online.

== LGBTQ+ health communication ==
The examination and research of LGBTQ+ health communication creates a way for health organizations to improve the quality of healthcare provided to individuals who identify as LGBTQ+. Health communication improves the quality of life and any care LGBTQ+ patients experience, such as sexual healthcare and trans-affirming care.

=== HIV/AIDS and LGBTQ+ health communication ===
LGBTQ+ health communication scholars have researched how HIV/AIDS can affect the LGBTQ+ community, including the negative stigmas that hindered research and proper disclosure of information. Early researchers examined how HIV/AIDS determines people's idea about sex and sexuality, including impacting how those with HIV communicate and how they think about themselves. The HIV/AIDS epidemic also created negative stigmas and stereotypes about certain LGBTQ+ groups; for example, researchers studied how HIV-positive men who have sex with men must navigate their sex life attempting to avoid tricky or taboo topics when communicating.

Misinformation is a common theme with HIV communication according to a study done on bisexual women in Canada that discussed how difficult it was for bisexual women to get the correct sexual health information. Many of the campaigns used fear-based approaches that the bisexual women found ineffective in promoting behavioral change; instead, they wanted practical information about HIV prevention using diverse examples of gender and culture. A different research project found discourse on HIV/AIDS in the intersection of medicine and politics. State governments create negative stigmas by quarantining HIV patients, which delayed care and put people's health and lives at risk.

=== LGBTQ+ Latina/o/x/e health communication ===
LGBTQ+ individuals who are also a part of Latina/o/x/e communities can experience health disparities, which are preventable differences that pertain to health tied to patients' identities. Many different aspects of healthcare affect LGBTQ+ Latina/o/x/e individuals including family communication, disclosure of their identity and sexuality during healthcare visits, and stigmas around sexual health. Researchers found that communication around the topic of sexual health is a complicated task that has roots in communication and identity. LGB Latinx individuals experience a stigma that can increase health disparities that white individuals might not experience. The disclosure of a patient's identity might not be in the best interest of the patient because that information might be released.

Health communication researchers have found that medical professionals place Latino LGBTQ+ youth into one large category and that Hispanic households ignore the topic of sexuality, which can make it difficult for youth to disclose information in a healthcare setting. Researchers focused on the film Tal Como Somos whose goal is to reduce the negative attitudes and generalizations towards gay, bisexual, and transgender (GBT) Latinos. The filmmakers have stated that they want both families and healthcare professionals to have positive attitudes towards GBT Latinos because research shows that negative attitudes towards GBT Latinos decrease their mental and physical health and impact personal relationships.

=== Trans-affirming health communication ===
Transgender communication studies researchers have examined the barriers that transgender people face frequently when seeking competent healthcare and treatment, including difficulties finding healthcare providers who want to provide services or do not degrade the trans patient in communicating with them while providing services, resulting in negative impacts for trans patients, such as higher rates of depression, suicide, and substance abuse. A study found that one in five transgender and gender non-conforming participants have been denied medical care, and roughly half have had to participate in teaching the medical provider about transgender care.

Health communication research investigates how transgender individuals need inclusive healthcare settings to safely access care. Healthcare professionals who are practicing trans-affirming healthcare communication can result in an improved quality of care for transgender people. Transgender people should also feel comfortable enough to disclose their health needs, gender identity, and sexuality to both their providers and their sexual partners through interpersonal communication.

Communication researchers have found that transgender people are an underserved population in healthcare, and they face difficulties when it comes to receiving culturally competent healthcare. Healthcare professionals can help improve health communication for transgender patients by creating a positive office environment, creating outreach and transgender health promotions, and healthcare providers can participate in personnel training to help improve their interactions with their transgender patients. Research has shown that transgender patients anticipate some stigmas and assumptions by medical providers during their visits and may withhold information to protect themselves. Transgender patients consider an inclusive co-cultural healthcare environment to be a healthcare provider providing positive and respectful health communication. Scholarship also states that healthcare organizations and providers can create a welcoming environment for transgender individuals through the implementation of trans-friendly infographics and when staff were required to participate in a trans-awareness training program.

== LGBTQ+ intercultural and international communication studies ==
LGBTQ+ individuals exist throughout many histories, cultures, and countries. LGBTQ+ intercultural communication and international communication highlights the differences and similarities between cultures, international LGBTQ+ communication theories, and how migration and immigration affects queer and trans individuals globally. LGBTQ+ intercultural communication studies look specifically at the culture and social impact that LGBTQ+ individuals experience while LGBTQ+ international communication studies look at the differences that LGBTQ+ individuals experience based on their geographic region.

=== LGBTQ+ migration and immigration communication ===
Communication researchers have analyzed how immigrants in the United States are often depicted in a poor light, being painted as criminals due to the media representation on immigration. Queer undocumented individuals are underrepresented in media and face an intersectional (overlapping discrimination based on different identities) type of discrimination. While navigating their new lives in a new country, they are also facing discrimination based on their sexuality or gender in relationship to their national identities. Even in countries with more accepting views towards LGBTQ+ communities, the culture of LGBTQ+ individuals differs regionally and internationally which is an added stressor to queer migration.

Communication scholarship that has examined countries such as the Netherlands, where LGBTQ+ rights are prevalent, yet navigating life as a queer immigrant continues to be a psychologically strenuous journey. Queer migrants communicate stressors including seeking asylum, their uncertain futures in their new country, and cultural differences entering a new country. Being LGBTQ+ adds another stressor to the migrants who further fear for their safety or eligibility for asylum if it is discovered they are queer. Qualitative research reveals that many queer individuals also have residual fear or anxieties about their sexuality due to the way they were treated in their country of origin.

Scholars have explored the migration of LGBTQ+ individuals and how they navigate family communication, support, and negative media attention. Research has also examined how LGBTQ+ migrants communicate with their families when they migrate. One study reviewed LGBTQ+ individuals moving to South Africa due to the country's constitutional promises of nondiscrimination on gender or sexual orientation, along with job prospects. Relatives in South Africa, as well as ones in their homeland, can offer essential emotional support and assistance post-migration. In the United States, many undocumented LGBTQ+ immigrants do not have family that are either permanent residents or U.S. citizens. Rhetoric scholars have examined how rhetoric of the family is used in immigration rights and justice campaigns, and they argue that the mainstream media's focus on family are harmful to migrants, especially more vulnerable ones like the LGBTQ+ community.

=== Queer African communication studies ===
LGBTQ+ individuals across many countries in Africa experience discrimination and cultural backlash for their identities. Communication studies researchers have explored how some traditional beliefs in Africa value male and female relationships, therefore queer relationships take away from their cultural norms, creating discourse about LGBTQ+ identities.

According to research on Ghana and queer communication studies, research has studied the discourse about the existence of LGBTQ+ identities and their acceptance or struggle in society. Some same sex loving men in Ghana refuse to identify with the LGBTQ+ community due to the stigma surrounding the word "gay." Instead, the same sex loving men in Ghana use the term "Sassoi," which means men that have relationships with other men. The Sassoi men in Ghana challenge heteronormativity and U.S LGBTQ+ identities by refusing to come out and put labels on their sexuality. Research found that these men face communication issues in healthcare settings where they are reluctant to tell providers that they engage in sexual activity with other men.

In Kenya, communication researchers studied how groups commonly hold misconceptions about the LGBTQ+ community. Cultural myths and folk tales cause individuals to fear and dislike the LGBTQ+ community. Scholars found that church leaders commonly communicate cultural myths about the LGBTQ+ community, further driving fear and dislike towards LGBTQ+ communities in Kenya.

=== Queer Asian communication studies ===
Queer communication studies in Asia bring in aspects of international communication and intercultural communication, focusing on the different cultural norms in Asia surrounding the queer community and the experience of LGBTQ+ individuals based on their physical country. In Queer Asian communication studies, scholars look at the impact that western counties have on LGBTQ+ individuals in Asia. The western and white view of queer existence in Asia impacts the Asian LGBTQ+ demographic by enforcing their views on what queer individuals in Asia should be.

Communication research has investigated norms for queer men in Tokyo to be perceived as more feminine than western individuals, feminizing the queer community in Tokyo. Asian queer individuals also face pressure from western societies through the idea of coming out. In China, researchers examined the traditional valuing of heterosexual male and female relationships, which can make coming out difficult for queer individuals. They also found that gay and lesbian Chinese people focused on their connection to their families and resisted the western norms of "coming out" treated as a necessity can harm Chinese queer individuals by applying pressure for them to choose between their family and their identity.

== LGBTQ+ performance studies and autoethnography ==
Performance studies and autoethnography utilize communication theories of personal narratives and ongoing embodied experiences to analyze communication. Performance studies on LGBTQ+ communication shows that personal narrative is based on theorizing perspective and ongoing experiences. In both performance studies and autoethnographic inquiry, no one narrative is put above someone else's story, and dialogues within the narratives representation an individual experience there for it "stands on its own."

=== LGBTQ+ drag and performance studies ===
Queer performance studies, like drag, was not made from a desire to perform, but as an act of resistance. Performance through drag sought to become resistance by being a spectacle and to grab the attention of audience members to see queer people anew. Not only do drag performers have a community within themselves, but they are also a central part of LGBTQ+ communities across the world with language and performative communication that was originally used by drag performers and is now more broadly used. Scholars examine drag as performance and research archives on queer performance to theorize protest, strength, and resistance.

Through TV shows like "RuPaul's Drag Race" popularization, drag has transitioned from something made to be a queer and trans resistance piece of art to something now meant for entertainment for cisheteronormative society. Cisheteronormativity is defined and understood by LGBTQ+ rhetors as the institutions that uphold heterosexuality and cisgender experiences. Performance research has also explored how transgender women are impacted by modern drag because of the cis and hetero normative standards of modern drag. LGBTQ+ communication studies scholars further discuss the racialization that is then compounded for trans Asian women, something heavily frowned on in a large section of Asian households leading many of them to experience shame from their families.

=== LGBTQ+ autoethnography and communication ===
Autoethnography is a form of academic writing where the author draws from their lived experiences. LGBTQ+ communication studies scholars utilize autoethnography when queer and trans scholars write about their experiences. Queer communication scholarship has utilized personal queer stories about HIV and what is like from a personal experience versus a doctor's input to provide better health communication practices. Autoethnography uses personal experiences to better support stressful health communication encounters and to show real people's experiences before and after they take an HIV test.

=== LGBTQ+ poetic inquiry ===
Poetic inquiry is a method that incorporates poetry and personal narratives to explore and embrace various identities and experiences. Poetic refers to an art that crafts words "to describe threshold moments," which are ways of interpreting the world, sense and perception, as well as an art of one's self. Poetic inquiry is a type of research communication and performance scholars use to examine lyrical and performative inquiry via poetry.

Poetic inquiry utilizes lyrical and performative modes and narrative modes of inquiry in order to promote multifaceted ways of knowing and expressing. Research has called for other future communication scholars to use performative writing to understand and embrace queer culture as a whole from a holistic perspective. By intertwining academic and scholarly writing with poetry and personal narrative, scholars show how queer of color people reflect on the impact of their experiences. LGBTQ+ communication research utilizing poetic inquiry provides space for marginalized voices to be heard. According to research, poetic inquiry laid out a way for LGBTQ+ participants to share their feelings, emotions, and concerns.

== LGBTQ+ rhetoric ==
LGBTQ+ rhetoric is the examination of techniques used by speakers writers and scholars to motivate and inform an audience on LGBTQ+ matters. Rhetoric is an art of persuasion, and it is used to study techniques in speaking, writing and argument. LGBTQ+ rhetoric research catalogues how communities reach out to both people within the community and outside of it to motivate and develop discovery and argument. Rhetoric scholarship has also focused on the rhetoric surrounding trans individuals and how discourse affects trans communities. Rhetorical research has examined how technical communication impacts trans people, such as how documents can exclude certain groups and make them invisible. The study of rhetoric towards the LGBTQ+ community is important to provide a sense of belonging, both in the sense of political rhetoric and everyday communication.

=== Queer counterpublics ===
Counterpublics are defined as "a subset of publics that stand in conscientious opposition to a dominant ideology and strategically subvert that ideology's construction in public discourse." Within the context of the queer community, this means disrupting heteronormativity and represents all facets of queer culture. The concept of counterpublics allow marginalized communities to build subcultures that foster further acceptance and belonging, as well as helping build safe spaces for queer youth in areas that might not be accessible for them such as bars or club settings.

=== Queer public memory rhetoric ===
Public memory research (sometimes referred to as collective memory) examines collective knowledge, information, memory, or shared experiences between a group that typically contributes to their identity. It can be communicated through a number of ways, such as oral tradition or written texts. Because of the history behind the stigmatization against LGBTQ+ identities, queer public memory scholarship can be associated with traumatic memories and experiences of past violence. However, public memory has also been utilized to help garner support for LGBTQ+ movements through showcasing the lives of people with intersectional identities whose stories tend to be underrepresented and showcasing the lives of those lost to anti-LGBTQ+ violence in order to foster unity and connection. Public memory, especially queer public memory, takes a number of different forms, from oration to physical monuments or texts, to digital archives. Scholars have cited the importance of digital archives as a resource for education, especially because of the increased ability for public interaction.

=== Queer and trans social movement rhetoric ===
Social movements are theorized as a social or political group of people trying to carry out change usually as a form of starting social progress or in reaction to injustices. Rhetorical research has examined how technical communication impacts trans people, and how the presence of physical representation in the world rather than just online encourages political participation and activism. Scholars found based around LGBTQ+ rhetoric has found that having a physical representation can further the use of rhetor in social movements beyond written or spoken word. The physical presence of advocacy in the world helps social movement rhetoric research people both inside and outside of the community making it possible for more movements and action.

=== Queer archives in rhetoric ===
Queer and trans archives are collections of texts and artifacts that LGBTQ+ rhetoricians analyze. These rhetorics ask what the unique approaches and strategies are that LGBTQ+ communities have used and are using to make meaning within their communities and to continue to grow in wider cultural and sociopolitical contexts.

A rhetorical analysis of professional LGBTQ+ groups looked into how institutions use their core beliefs to exclude. A different study found that intersectional rhetoric can encourage critics to try to comprehend power and identity and how they influence social justice. Queer archival research looks into the intersectionality of identities and how it affects power dynamics in interpersonal communications and group settings.

=== Transgender rhetoric ===
Rhetorical scholars have studied rhetoric about transgender people in sports. Scholarship in rhetoric of transgender individuals in sports has examined anti-trans rhetoric as encouraging "othering," which is the social act of outcasting individuals, often whom have already been historically marginalized. This comes as trans people are becoming increasingly more "out" in sports. Aligning with the rhetoric of othering, rhetoricians have studied legislation in states as rhetorical texts, such as Idaho's "Fairness in Women's Sports Act" that attempt to ban trans women and girls in sports designated for women and girls. Other transgender rhetoric scholars have examined trans healthcare. In Texas, Ken Paxton released a statement in 2022 over trans healthcare for youth that argued that gender affirming care can be viewed as child abuse, which was analyzed by scholars as rhetorical text.

== LGBTQ+ media studies ==
Communication studies and media studies researchers investigate how media depict LGBTQ+ characters, stories, and experiences. Scholarship has examined LGBTQ+ representation across film, TV, video games, and literature. Others have studied how writers created LGBTQ+ characters, such as interviews with Spanish screenwriters about their writing of queer and trans characters. New research is also examining LGBTQ+ people's use of social media and LGBTQ+ topics in media.

=== LGBTQ+ film and TV representation ===
Representation in media has shaped how societies now see LGBTQ+ communities. Communication and media scholars examine overall representation of LGBTQ+ characters and stories. GLAAD releases an annual research report called "Where Are We on TV" about LGBTQ+ characters on TV. In the 2023-2024 report, only 8.6% of primetime scripted characters were LGBTQ+, and there was a reduction to 468 total LGBTQ+ characters in 2023-2024 versus 637 in 2021-2022.

Representation in media can create experiences of inclusion or exclusion for marginalized or underrepresented audiences according to research. Media such as TV shows, movies, video games, books, and art play important roles in the lives of children, adolescents, and even adults. Heteronormativity is communicated through different types of media, including films and TV show, even in zombie apocalypse fantasy narratives. Media representation can also help eliminate stereotypes of LGBTQ+ people.

=== LGBTQ+ social media and communication ===
Communication within LGBTQ+ communities has been impacted by social media platforms according to research. Researchers discuss how LGBTQ+ communication on social media has potential for empowerment but also note challenges with the issues of privacy concerns, online harassment, spread of misinformation, and identity disclosure. For empowerment, researchers have shown that LGBTQ+ youth participating in communication on social media might contribute to their overall well being, improves mental health, self esteem, social support, and identity affirmation. Interacting on social media provides spaces for self-expression, identity exploration, and connections with queer and trans communities.

Research on communication and social media (specifically YouTube) found that social media has supported trans youth, but videos often focus on framing "successful" bodily transitions, such as the ability to "pass" rather than communicating about daily life. Focusing on "passing" on social media can also imply that trans people are forced to confirm to binary genders and ignores those who are nonbinary.

== See also ==
- LGBTQ communication studies
- Communication studies
- Queer studies
- Transgender studies
