= Text inferencing =

Process of logical induction or deduction during reading

Text inferencing describes the tacit or active process of logical induction or deduction during reading. Inferences are used to bridge current text ideas with antecedent text ideas or ideas in the reader's store of prior world knowledge. Text inferencing is an area of study within the fields of cognitive psychology and linguistics. Much of the information extracted from text is not understood as or remembered from things stated directly in that text, but from abstractions, inferences, and higher order understandings of the text material. Thus, inferences help maintain a coherent discourse representation by organizing and making sense of otherwise seemingly disjointed text ideas

== Types of Inferences ==
Logical Inferences, Bridging (Backward) Inferences, and Elaborative (Forward) Inferences

== Forward ==
Inferences made in text are generally said to be either "forward" or "backward" in relation to the current text idea. Forward inferences require the reader to bridge the current text idea to prior world knowledge, and are also referred to as "elaborative inferences." Consider the following sentence: "The director and the cameraman were ready to shoot closeups when suddenly the actress fell from the 14th story." This type of inference is also referred to as a "predictive inference" because the reader is inferring something about events to come. The experimental evidence has suggested that upon reading sentences such as that one, readers activate concepts such as "dead", suggesting that they inferred the actress died. Such an inference almost seems necessary if full comprehension of the story is to occur. Other types of elaborative inferences are inferences regarding characters or instruments described in the text. Predictive inferences are not made as reliably and not last as long in memory as other types of inferences, and are largely based on the amount of biasing context provided by nearby text ideas

== Backward ==
Backward inferences require the reader to bridge the current text idea to one that occurred earlier in the text. These types of inferences are also referred to as "bridging inferences." For example, if a reader came across the following sentences together, they would need to have inferred that the sentences are related to one-another if they are to make any sense of the text as a whole: "Mary poured the water on the bonfire. The fire went out." The type of inference drawn here is also called a "causal inference" because the inference made suggests that events in one sentence cause those in the next. Backward inferences can be either logical, in that the reader assumes one occurrence based on the statement of another, or pragmatic, in that the inference helps the reader comprehend the story coherently, like in the previous example.

== See also ==
- Cognitive psychology
- Language processing
- Sentence processing
- Linguistics
