= Organizational architecture =

Procedural structure of an organization

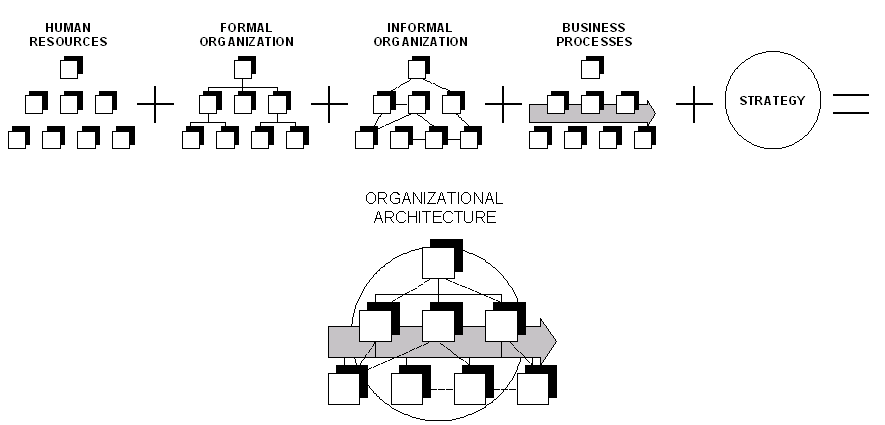
Simplified scheme of an organization

Organizational architecture, also known as organizational design, is a field concerned with the creation of roles, processes, and formal reporting relationships in an organization. It refers to architecture metaphorically, as a structure which fleshes out the organizations. The various features of a business's organizational architecture has to be internally consistent in strategy, architecture and competitive environment.

It provides the framework through which an organization aims to realize its core qualities as specified in its vision statement. It provides the infrastructure into which business processes are deployed and ensures that the organization's core qualities are realized across the business processes deployed within the organization. In this way, organizations aim to consistently realize their core qualities across the services they offer to their clients. This perspective on organizational architecture is elaborated below.

== Content ==
According to most authors organizational architecture is a metaphor. Like traditional architecture, it shapes the organizational (some authors would say the informational) space where life will take place. It also represents a concept which implies a connection between the organizational structure and other systems inside the organization in order to create a unique synergistic system that will be more than just the sum of its parts.

Conventionally organizational architecture consists of the formal organization (organizational structure), informal organization (organizational culture), business processes, strategy and the most important human resources, because what is an organization if not a system of people? The table shows some approaches to organizational architecture.

Nadler and Tushman (1997)	Merron (1995)	Galbraith (1995)	Henning(1997)	Churchill (1997)	Corporate Transitions International (2004)
	Vision, strategic goals and strategic management	Strategy	The role of the organization		Strategy
Informal organization	Organizational culture	Reward systems	Reward systems	Organizational culture	Organizational culture
Formal organization	Organizational structure	Organizational structure	Groupings	Organizational structure	Organizational structure
Business processes		Processes and lateral links	Business processes and work design		
Human resources		Human resources		Human resource development	Communication

The goal of organizational architecture is to create an organization that will be able to continuously create value for present and future customers, optimizing and organizing itself.

Some under organizational architecture understand building blocks, which are mandatory for the growth of the organization. To design an organization means to set up a stage where the drama of life will take place.

== Design ==
=== Design process and approach ===
Although the process of organization design isn't necessarily linear, a five milestone process has been created to organize the approach. The five milestone design process is as follows:

1. Business case and discovery
  1. Goal: Build a business case for the change; compare the current state to future state and implications that would be involved.
  2. Milestone: at the end of this phase, the problem to be solved is clear.
2. Strategic grouping
  1. Goal: Determine what basic grouping of work will create the capabilities necessary to deliver the decided strategy.
  2. Milestone: Decided on a structure change which supports the strategy.
3. Integration
  1. Goal: The boundaries created by grouping work must be breached to deliver results for customers, partners and shareholders.
  2. Milestone: Pieces have been tied together and defined power relationships.
4. Talent and leadership
  1. Goal: Determine the number of positions, the profile of a candidate who will fill those positions, and who will report to the leader of the new structure(s).
  2. Milestone: Critical roles have been designed and staffed and defined work for the executive team.
5. Transition
  1. Goal: Set the transition plan to account for a logical implementation plan.
  2. Milestone: The change is being executed and lead, and closely monitoring the changes to prepare for any adjustments

=== Reshaping organization structure ===
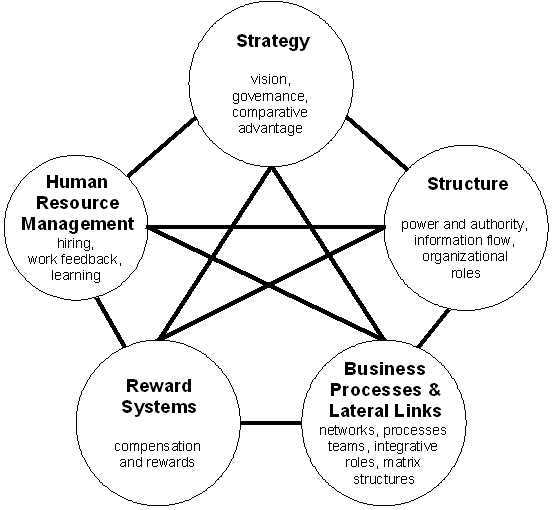
Galbraith's Star Model of organizational design

Organization design can be defined, narrowly, as the process of reshaping organization structure and roles. It can also be more effectively defined as the alignment of structure, process, rewards, metrics, and talent with the strategy of the business. Jay Galbraith and Amy Kates have made the case persuasively (building on years of work by Galbraith) that attention to all of these organizational elements is necessary to create new capabilities to compete in a given market. This systemic view, often referred to as the "star model" approach, is more likely to lead to better performance.

Organization design may involve strategic decisions, but is properly viewed as a path to effective strategy execution. The design process nearly always entails making trade-offs of one set of structural benefits for another. Many companies fall into the trap of making repeated changes in organization structure, with little benefit to the business. This often occurs because changes in structure are relatively easy to execute while creating the impression that something substantial is happening. This often leads to cynicism and confusion within the organization. More powerful change happens when there are clear design objectives driven by a new business strategy or forces in the market require a different approach to organize resources.

The organization design process is often explained in phases. Phase one is the definition of a business case, including a clear picture of strategy and design objectives. This step is typically followed by "strategic grouping" decisions, which define the fundamental architecture of the organization - essentially deciding which major roles will report at the top of the organization. The classic options for strategic grouping are to organize by:

- Behavior
- Function
- Product or category
- Customer or market
- Geography
- Matrix

Each of the basic building block options for strategic grouping brings a set of benefits and drawbacks. However, such generic pros and cons are not the basis for choosing the best strategic grouping. An analysis must be completed relative to a specific business strategy.

Subsequent phases of organization design include operational design of processes, roles, measures, and reward systems, followed by staffing and other implementation tasks.

The field is somewhat specialized in nature and many large and small consulting firms offer organization design assistance to executives. Some companies attempt to establish internal staff resources aimed at supporting organization design initiatives. There is a substantial body of literature in the field, arguably starting with the work of Peter Drucker in his examination of General Motors decades ago. Other key thinkers built on Drucker's thinking, including Galbraith (1973), Nadler, et al. (1992) and Lawrence and Lorsch (1967).

Organization design can be considered a subset of the broader field of organization effectiveness and organization development, both of which may entail more behaviorally focused solutions to effectiveness, such as leadership behaviors, team effectiveness and other characteristics of that nature. Many organizational experts argue for an integrated approach to these disciplines, including effective talent management practices.

=== Various approaches ===
There are various approaches to organizational architecture including

- (1986, 1991, 2004) - Kenneth D. Mackenzie
- (1992, 1993) - David A. Nadler and Michael L. Tushman.
- Organizational Architecture - by David A. Nadler, Marc S. Gerstein and Robert B. Shaw.
- (1993, 1995) - Designing organizations using the STAR Model as developed by Jay Galbraith
- Benjamin's Layered Model of organizations.
- The Organizational Adaption Model by Raymond E. Miles and Charles C. Snow.
- (1995) - Richard M. Burton and Børge Obel
- (2001) - Ralph Kilmann
- (2004) - Richard L. Daft

=== Five principles of good design ===
1. Specialization principle - the primary concern in the specialization principle how to group responsibilities into units. The unit boundaries should be defined to achieve the important benefits available.
2. Coordination principle - this principle links closely with the specialization principle, to ensure the links are established between the units.
3. Knowledge and competence principle - the primary concern in this principle is determining which responsibilities to decentralize and what hierarchical levels to create.
4. Control and commitment principle - the primary concern in this principle is insuring managers have a process to effectively discharge decentralized principles.
5. Innovation and adaptation principle - the primary concern in this principle is insuring the organization can change and evolve in the future.

=== Five good design tests ===
Each tests coincides with the principles previously mentioned.

1. Specialist culture test (Specialization Principle)
2. Difficult links test (Coordination Principle)
3. Redundant hierarchy test (Knowledge and Competence Principle)
4. Accountability test (Control and Commitment Principle)
5. Flexibility test (Innovation and Adaptation Principle)

== Characteristics of effective organizational design ==
Some systems are effective and efficient whereas others are not. Successful systems may be attributable to the skill exercised in designing the system or to the quality of management practised during operations, or both. Successful systems are characterized by their simplicity, flexibility, reliability, economy, and acceptability. Simplicity, flexibility, and reliability tend to be a function of design, whereas economy and acceptability pertain to both design and operations. Numerous relationships exist among these characteristics; for example, simplicity will affect economy and possibly reliability. Moreover, management must reach a compromise between economy and reliability, and between technical efficiency and organizational climate. The balance reached will determine whether short- or long-run objectives are optimized.

- Simplicity

An effective organizational system need not be complex. On the contrary, simplicity in design is a desirable quality. Consider the task of communicating information about the operation of a system and the allocation of its inputs. The task is not difficult when components are few and the relationships among them are straightforward. However, the problems of communication multiply with each successive stage of complexity.

The proper method for maintaining simplicity is to use precise definitions and to outline the specific task for each subsystem. Total systems often become complex because of the sheer size and nature of operations, but effectiveness and efficiency may still be achieved if each subsystem maintains its simplicity.

- Flexibility

Conditions change and managers should be prepared to adjust operations accordingly. There are two ways to adjust to a changing operating environment: to design new systems or to modify operating systems. An existing system should not be modified to accommodate a change in objectives, but every system should be sufficiently flexible to integrate changes that may occur either in the environment or in the nature of the inputs. For example, a company should not use the same system to build missiles as it uses to build airplanes, nor the same system to sell insurance as the one originally designed to sell magazines. However, it should be possible to modify an existing system to produce different sizes, varieties, or types of the same product or service.

A practical system must be well designed but it cannot be entirely rigid. There will always be minor variations from the general plan, and a system should be able to adapt to such changes without excessive confusion. The advantages associated with having a flexible system will become more apparent when we consider the difficulty of administering change.

- Reliability

System reliability is an important factor in organizations. Reliability is the consistency with which operations are maintained, and may vary from zero output (a complete breakdown or work stoppage) to a constant or predictable output. The typical system operates somewhere between these two extremes. The characteristics of reliability can be designed into the system by carefully selecting and arranging the operating components; the system is no more reliable than its weakest segment. When the requirements for a particular component — such as an operator having unique skills — are critical, it may be worthwhile to maintain a standby operator. In all situations, provisions should be made for quick repair or replacement when failure occurs. One valid approach to the reliability-maintenance relationship is to use a form of construction that permits repair by replacing a complete unit. In some television sets, for example, it is common practice to replace an entire section of the network rather than try to find the faulty component. Reliability is not as critical an issue when prompt repair and recovery can be instituted.

- Economy

An effective system is not necessarily an economical (efficient) system. For example, the postal service may keep on schedule with mail deliveries but only by hiring a large number of additional workers. In this case, the efficiency of the postal system would be reduced. In another example, inventories may be controlled by using a comprehensive system of storekeeping. However, if the cost of the storekeeping were greater than the potential savings from this degree of control, the system would not be efficient. It is often dysfunctional and expensive to develop much greater capacity for one segment of a system than for some other part. Building in redundancy or providing for every contingency usually neutralizes the operating efficiency of the system. When a system's objectives include achieving a particular task at the lowest possible cost, there must be some degree of trade-off between effectiveness and efficiency. When a system's objective is to perform a certain mission regardless of cost, there can be no trade-off.

- Acceptability

Any system, no matter how well designed, will not function properly unless it is accepted by the people who operate it. If the participants do not believe it will benefit them, are opposed to it, are pressured into using it, or think it is not a good system, it will not work properly. If a system is not accepted, two things can happen:(1) the system will be modified gradually by the people who are using it, or (2) the system will be used ineffectively and ultimately fail. Unplanned alterations in an elaborate system can nullify advantages associated with using the system.

== Differentiation and integration ==
A basic consideration in the design of organizations is dividing work into reasonable tasks (differentiation) while giving simultaneous attention to coordinating these activities and unifying their results into a meaningful whole (integration). Two guidelines may be followed in grouping activities:

1. Units that have similar orientations and tasks should be grouped together. (They can reinforce each other's common concern and the arrangement will simplify the coordinating task of a common manager).
2. Units required to integrate their activities closely should be grouped together. (The common manager can coordinate them through the formal hierarchy).

When units neither have similar orientations nor share their activities, the task of grouping becomes more difficult. For example, when units are similar in nature and function but are also relatively independent, the manager must base their decision on the most appropriate way to group activities according to their past experience.

A difficult task associated with system-subsystem determination is to establish proper boundaries of operations. The more specific and distinct the goals of the operation, the easier it is to set boundaries. Other factors such as the influence of the environment, the availability of men and machines, the time schedule for design and operation, the cost of alternative designs, and the particular biases of the designers must be considered when establishing boundaries.

== The role of management ==
Designers organize people and machines into functional combinations intended to achieve efficiency and effectiveness within constraints. The characteristics of such a system include simplicity, flexibility, reliability, economy, and acceptability..

At this point, the designer must determine what has to be done to achieve the stated objective(s) and how the total task can be divided into meaningful units. Of the many possible combinations, one must be selected as that which satisfies the decision criteria better than the other alternatives. Of course, the balance between technical efficiency and the human factors that determine organizational climate should be included in making this decision. The eventual success or failure of the project is somewhat predetermined by management's attitude and the relationship between the designers and those who must implement the process.

The systems approach suggests a new role for management. In the traditional view, the manager operated in a highly structured, rigid system having well-defined goals, clear-cut relationships, tight controls, and hierarchical information flows. In the flexible (or open) systems view, the organization is not static but is continually evolving to meet both external and internal changes. The manager's role is to develop a viable organization, cope with change, and help participants establish a dynamic equilibrium. Leonard Sayles has expressed the manager's problem as follows:

“The one enduring objective is the effort to build and maintain a predictable, reciprocating system of relationships, the behavioral patterns of which stay within reasonable physical limits. But this is seeking a moving equilibrium, since the parameters of the system (the division of labor and the controls) are evolving and changing. Thus, the manager endeavors to introduce regularity in a world that will never allow him to achieve the ideal”.

The systems approach does not offer a prescription for making a manager's difficult and complex job easier. Rather it helps him understand and operate more effectively within the reality of complex systems. The systems approach suggests that operations cannot be neatly departmentalized but must be viewed as overlapping subsystems. In addition, it suggests that leadership patterns must be modified, particularly when dealing with professionals and highly trained specialists, and motivation must take the form of active, willing participation rather than forceful subjugation.

Systems design involves establishing projects and facilitating subsystems to accomplish certain tasks or programs. In this approach, the network of human independence required to accomplish a given task is based on the shared responsibility of all members of the subsystem. In contrast, the traditional organization is geared to functional performance and the integrating force is authority. Instead of gearing participant activities to obedience to rules and closely structured behavior, the systems approach provides a basis for active cooperation in meeting task requirements. The manager is looked upon as a resource person who can help the group meet its goals and also as a source of authority and control. Thus, systems theory lends a structure by which the concepts of motivation, leadership, and participation can be applied effectively within the organization.

Implementation is, of course, implicit in the connotation of systems design; otherwise it would be nothing more than an empty exercise. It follows that the interface between managers and systems designers is critical, and mutual understanding must be fostered to maximize returns from design efforts. The system must be tailored to the needs of the organization and adapted continually as circumstances change. In a general sense, managers engage in systems design on a day-to-day basis when they plan activities and organize systems to accomplish objectives. Specialized staff groups have evolved to perform tasks such as long-range planning, organizational studies, and systems design. However, since managers are ultimately responsible for organizational endeavors, they should make a special effort to help ensure the development of useful systems and to make design activities an extension of the manager's role rather than a separate function.

Operating managers need to understand the organizational decision-making requirements and the information needed to support the system. Although the probability of success in implementation is enhanced considerably if management is vitally interested in the project, technical expertise and motivation for change are more likely to be found in staff groups. The solution to the apparent dichotomy would seem to be a team approach, with specialists supporting operating managers who are responsible for the project's success. A manager might devote either part-time to such an effort or full-time temporarily, if the task requires it.

A project involving an integrated system for the entire company might well require years to complete. If operating people are delegated responsibility and authority for such a project, particularly if they are delegated the authority to outline specifications, they should also maintain sufficient contact with the day-to-day operations and its attendant information flow to retain their expertise for decision making. If the environment is dynamic or internal capabilities undergo change, it might be wise to rotate people from operations to systems design periodically, so that operating expertise is updated continually.

== See also ==
- Organizational design
- Organizational structure
- Departmentalization
- Enterprise architecture framework
- Interdisciplinary Center for Organizational Architecture
- View model
