= Rick L. Edgeman =

American academic

Rick L. Edgeman (born 1954 in Pueblo, Colorado - USA) is an American statistician and quality professional, and Professor of Sustainability & Performance at AU Herning and in the Interdisciplinary Center for Organizational Architecture, at Aarhus University, School of Business and Social Sciences. Concurrently, he is visiting professor in the Centre for Sustainable Operations & Resilient Supply Chains (CSORSC) at The University of Adelaide (Australia).

He is primarily known for his work on Quality Management, Performance Management and Sustainable Enterprise Excellence (SEE). He is an Academician of the International Academy of Quality.

== Education ==
- 2019 - Cornell University - Systems Thinking
- 2004 - Villanova University (USA) - Six Sigma Black Belt
- 1983 - University of Wyoming (USA) - Ph.D. in Statistics
- 1979 - University of Northern Colorado (USA) - M.S. Research & Statistical Methods
- 1977 - Colorado State University-Pueblo (USA) - B.S. Experimental Psychology

== Biography ==
In addition to Aarhus University, his posts included Statistical Science Department Professor & Chair at the University of Idaho (2004–2011), QUEST Professor & QUEST Honors Program Executive Director in the Robert H. Smith School of Business at the University of Maryland (2001–2004), Professor of Computer Information Systems & Director of the Center for Quality & Productivity Improvement (CQPI) at Colorado State University (1988–2001), President's Distinguished Scholar - Professor & Chair of Management - and Center for Entrepreneurship Director at Fort Hays State University, and early career stints at the University of North Texas, Bradley University, and in the Center for Quality & Applied Statistics at the Rochester Institute of Technology.

A Six Sigma Black Belt, Edgeman was a visiting professor in the Faculty of Management & Economics at Tomas Bata University in Zlín in the Czech Republic, Leicester Castle Business School of De Montfort University in the United Kingdom, the Quality Sciences Division at Uppsala University in Sweden, Quality & Environmental Management Division at Luleå University of Technology (Sweden), and University of Lugano in Switzerland, Invited Professor at the Versailles Business School, University of Versailles Saint-Quentin en Yvelines (France), and Honorary Professor Professor of Engineering Operations Management in the Department of Technology & Innovation at University of Southern Denmark.

Invited lectures and keynotes include ones at Oxford University, the Royal Melbourne Institute of Technology, and on behalf of the National Science Foundation.

== Research ==
Edgeman's research addresses quality, innovation, consciousness, six sigma innovation & design, sustainability, and statistical methods for quality & reliability engineering.

He has served on the Editorial Review Boards of Total Quality Management & Business Excellence, The Six Sigma Forum, Quality Engineering, International Journal of Product Development, International Journal of Manufacturing Technology & Management, International Journal of Business Performance Management, and the Business & Entrepreneurship Journal.

== Selected publications ==
- Edgeman, Rick. "Complex Management Systems & the Shingo Model: Foundations of Operational Excellence & Supporting Tools". Routledge Taylor & Francis Group. 290 pp. (2019)
- Edgeman, Rick. "Strategic resistance for sustaining enterprise relevance: A paradigm for sustainable enterprise excellence, resilience and robustness", International Journal of Productivity and Performance Management, Vol. 64 Iss: 3, p. 318 (2015)
- Edgeman, Rick; Williams, Joseph A. "Enterprise self-assessment analytics for sustainability, resilience and robustness", The TQM Journal, Vol. 26 Iss: 4, p. 368 (2014)
- Edgeman, Rick L.; Eskildsen, Jacob."Modeling and Assessing Sustainable Enterprise Excellence", Business Strategy and the Environment, Vol. 33 Iss: 3, p. 173 (2013)
- Edgeman, Rick. "Sustainable Enterprise Excellence: towards a framework for holistic data-analytics", Corporate Governance, Vol. 13 Iss: 5, p. 527 (2013)
- Edgeman, Rick L.; Klefsjö, Bengt; and Wiklund, Håkan. "Six Sigma Seen as a Methodology for Total Quality Management", Measuring Business Excellence, Vol. 5, Iss: 1, p. 31 (2001)
- Edgeman, Rick L.."BEST business excellence:: an expanded view", Measuring Business Excellence, Vol. 4 Iss: 4, p. 15 (2000)
