= Wendy K. Smith =

American business professor

- Occupation: Business professor
- Known for: paradox theory
- Title: Dana J. Johnson Professor of Management
- Spouse: Michael A. Posner
- Children: 3

Academic background
- Education: Yale University (B.A.); Harvard University (M.A.); Harvard Business School (Ph.D.)
- Thesis: Managing strategic contradictions: Top management teams balancing existing products and innovation simultaneously (2006)
- Doctoral advisor: Michael L. Tushman
- Other advisors: Amy C. Edmondson, J. Richard Hackman

Academic work
- Institutions: Lerner College of Business and Economics, University of Delaware

Wendy K. Smith is an American business professor. She is the Dana J. Johnson Professor of Management and director of the Women’s Leadership Initiative at the Lerner College of Business and Economics, University of Delaware. A fellow of the Academy of Management, her research on paradox theory examines how leaders manage interdependent, seemingly contradictory tensions, and demonstrates that a “both/and” mindset leads to improved business performance in complex organizational environments.

== Education ==
Smith earned her undergraduate degree from Yale University in political psychology in 1996. In 2004, she earned an M.A. in psychology from Harvard University and a Ph.D in organizational behavior from the Harvard Business School in 2006.

== Career ==
Smith was hired at the University of Delaware in 2006. She co-founded and is the faculty director of the university's Women’s Leadership Initiative. Her research focuses on strategic paradoxes encountered by leaders and provides frameworks for more effective responses to contradictory, interdependent tensions. She notes that these tensions cannot be resolved through trade-offs or linear decision-making, but instead requires a “both/and” mindset that accepts contradiction and gains insight from it, thus enabling organizations to leverage them more creatively and productively.

From 2019-2025, Smith received the Highly Cited Researchers award for being among the top 0.1% most-cited researchers in academic journals indexed by Web of Science. She also received the Decade Award in 2021 from the Academy of Management Review along with her co-author Marianne W. Lewis for their 2011 paper “Toward a Theory of Paradox: A Dynamic Equilibrium Model of Organizing”. She, along with Lewis, was selected for the Thinkers50 Breakthrough Idea Award in 2023, and they made the Thinkers50 Ranked list in 2025.

In 2022, Smith was elected Fellow of the Academy of Management.

== Selected publications ==
- Smith, Wendy K.; Tushman, Michael L. (2005). "Managing Strategic Contradictions: A Top Management Model for Managing Innovation Streams". Organization Science. 16 (5): 522–536. doi:10.1287/orsc.1050.0134. ISSN 1047-7039.
- Smith, Wendy K.; Lewis, Marianne W. (2011). "Toward a Theory of Paradox: A Dynamic equilibrium Model of Organizing". Academy of Management Review. 36 (2): 381–403. doi:10.5465/amr.2009.0223.
- Smith, Wendy K.; Lewis, Marianne W. (2012). "Leadership Skills for Managing Paradoxes". Industrial and Organizational Psychology. 5 (2): 227–231. doi:10.1111/j.1754-9434.2012.01435.x. S2CID 145098830.
- Besharov, Marya L.; Smith, Wendy K. (2014). "Multiple Institutional Logics in Organizations: Explaining Their Varied Nature and Implications". Academy of Management Review. 39 (3): 364–381. doi:10.5465/amr.2011.0431. ISSN 0363-7425.
- Lewis, Marianne W.; Andriopoulos, Costas; Smith, Wendy K. (2014). "Paradoxical Leadership to Enable Strategic Agility" (PDF). California Management Review. 56 (3): 58–77. doi:10.1525/cmr.2014.56.3.58. S2CID 56266128.
- Schad, Jonathan; Lewis, Marianne W.; Raisch, Sebastian; Smith, Wendy K. (2016). "Paradox Research in Management Science: Looking Back to Move Forward". Academy of Management Annals. 10 (1): 5–64. doi:10.5465/19416520.2016.1162422. ISSN 1941-6520.
- Smith, Wendy K.; Lewis, Marianne W. (2022). Both/and Thinking: Embracing Creative Tensions to Solve Your Toughest Problems. Harvard Business Review Press. ISBN 978-1-64782-104-3.

== Personal life ==
Smith is married to Michael A. Posner, who is a professor of Statistics and Data Science at Villanova University. They have three children.
