= Alain Bensoussan =

French mathematician (born 1940)

9th president of the French Space Agency
- In office 1996–2003
- Preceded by: André Lebeau
- Succeeded by: Yannick d'Escatha

Personal details
- Born: May 12, 1940 (age 86) Tunis, Tunisia

Academic background
- Education: École polytechnique ENSAE ParisTech
- Doctoral advisor: Jacques-Louis Lions

Academic work
- Institutions: École normale supérieure University of Paris-Dauphine; University of Texas at Dallas
- Doctoral students: Étienne Pardoux; Agnès Sulem

Alain Bensoussan (born 12 May 1940) is a French mathematician. He is Professor Emeritus at the University of Paris-Dauphine and Professor at the University of Texas at Dallas.

== Early life and education ==
Alain Bensoussan was born on 12 May 1940 in Tunis, Tunisia. Bensoussan is a former student of the École polytechnique (X1960), a graduate of ENSAE and a doctor of mathematics from the Faculty of Sciences in Paris (1969) under the supervision of Jacques-Louis Lions.

== Career ==
He was a lecturer at the École polytechnique from 1970 to 1986 and a professor at the École normale supérieure from 1980 to 1985. He was Director of the European Institute for Advanced Studies in Management, Brussels from 1975 to 1977. He was President of INRIA from 1984 to 1996, President of the National Centre for Space Studies (CNES) from 1996 to 2003, President of the Council of the European Space Agency (ESA) from 1999 to 2002.

His former students include Peng Shige, Guy Pujolle, Étienne Pardoux, Jean-Michel Lasry.

== Awards and honours ==
- Member of the French Academy of Sciences
- Gay-Lussac Humboldt Prize (1984)
- IEEE Fellow (1985)
- Member of Academia Europaea (1985)
- Commandeur of the Ordre National du Mérite (2000)
- Member of the French Academy of Technologies (2000)
- Member of the International Academy of Astronautics (2001)
- Distinguished Public Service Medal, NASA (2001)
- Special award from the Association aéronautique et astronautique de France (2002)
- Officier of the Légion d'Honneur (2003)
- Officer of the Order of Merit of the Federal Republic of Germany (2003)
- SIAM Fellow, 2009
- Fellow of the American Mathematical Society (2012)
- Reid Award (2014)
- Top 2% most highly cited scientists
- IEEE Control Systems Award 2024
