= Marianne W. Lewis =

American business professor and academic administrator

- Education: Tusculum College (1989); Kelley School of Business at Indiana University (1991); Gatton College of Business and Economics at the University of Kentucky (1997)
- Occupation: Academic
- Known for: Dean of the Cass Business School
- Parent(s): Steven C. Wheelwright; Margaret Steele

Marianne W. Lewis is an American academic and since 2019 the dean for Carl H. Lindner College of Business (Lindner College of Business) at the University of Cincinnati. She was previously the dean of the Cass Business School in London, England. Her research on paradox theory examines how organizations can simultaneously embrace persistent, interwoven tensions rather than choosing between them, showing that actively engaging with and managing apparent “both/and” contradictions can lead to opportunities for learning and sustained high performance.

== Early life and education ==
Lewis was born in Salt Lake City, the eldest of five children, to Steven C. Wheelwright and Margaret Steele. Her father is an academic who served as senior associate dean at the Harvard Business School and later as president of Brigham Young University–Hawaii from 2007 to 2015.

Lewis graduated from Tusculum College in 1989. She received a master of business administration from the Kelley School of Business at Indiana University in 1991. She went on to receive a PhD in Management from the Gatton College of Business and Economics at the University of Kentucky in 1997. Her thesis was entitled Advanced Manufacturing Technology Design: A Multiparadigm Study.

== Career ==
Lewis became a Professor of Management at Lindner College of Business in 1996, and served as its associate dean from 2009 until 2015. She was a visiting fellow at Keele University in 2000 and a Fulbright Scholar at Cardiff University in 2014. She is a member of the Society for Industrial and Organizational Psychology, and serves on the advisory board of the Future Business Journal. She served as the Dean of the Cass Business School in London from 2015 to 2019, and is the first woman to lead the Lindner College of Business.

Lewis’ studies into paradox theory opened a new field in management research. She clarified what constitutes a paradox and distinguished it from other forms of tension. Whereas earlier research treated tensions as problems to be resolved through optimal solutions, paradox theory re-framed them as persistent, interdependent contradictions that cannot be eliminated but rather managed. By explaining how opposing elements reinforce one another and how such tensions can be navigated, Lewis helped establish paradox as a distinct category of organizational tension and a lens for organizational change. She noted that people with a paradox mindset accept tensions, recognizing them as opportunities for learning, and identify "both/and" alternatives that help their organizations to be more innovative.

Lewis is a recipient of the 2007 Best Paper Award from the Academy of Management Review for her article entitled, "Exploring Paradox: Toward a More Comprehensive Guide", and received the Decade Award in 2021 from the same journal along with her co-author Wendy K. Smith for their 2011 paper “Toward a Theory of Paradox: A Dynamic Equilibrium Model of Organizing”. She, along with Smith, was selected for the Thinkers50 Breakthrough Idea Award in 2023, and they made the Thinkers50 Ranked list in 2025.

== Personal life ==
Lewis has 3 children, 2 sons and 1 daughter.

== Selected publications ==
- Lewis, Marianne W. (October 2000). "Exploring Paradox: Toward a More Comprehensive Guide". The Academy of Management Review. 25 (4): 760–776. doi:10.5465/amr.2000.3707712. JSTOR 259204.
- Luscher, Lotte S.; Lewis, Marianne W. (2008). "Organizational Change and Managerial Sensemaking: Working Through Paradox". Academy of Management Journal. 51 (2): 221–240. doi:10.5465/amj.2008.31767217.
- Andriopoulos, Costas; Lewis, Marianne K. (2009). "Exploitation-Exploration Tensions and Organizational Ambidexterity: Managing Paradoxes of Innovation". Organization Science. 20 (4): 696–717. doi:10.1287/orsc.1080.0406. S2CID 15773886.
- Andriopoulos, Costas; Lewis, Marianne W. (2010). "Managing Innovation Paradoxes: Ambidexterity Lessons from Leading Product Design Companies". Long Range Planning. 43: 104–122. doi:10.1016/j.lrp.2009.08.003.
- Knapp, Joshua R.; Dalziel, Thomas; Lewis, Marianne W. (2011). "Governing Top Managers: Board Control, Social Categorization, and Their Unintended Influence on Discretionary Behaviors". Corporate Governance: An International Review. 19 (4): 295–310. doi:10.1111/j.1467-8683.2011.00845.x. S2CID 153948785.
- Smith, Wendy K.; Lewis, Marianne W. (2011). "Toward a Theory of Paradox: A Dynamic equilibrium Model of Organizing". Academy of Management Review. 36 (2): 381–403. doi:10.5465/amr.2009.0223.
- Smith, Wendy K.; Lewis, Marianne W. (2012). "Leadership Skills for Managing Paradoxes". Industrial and Organizational Psychology. 5 (2): 227–231. doi:10.1111/j.1754-9434.2012.01435.x. S2CID 145098830.
- Lewis, Marianne W.; Andriopoulos, Costas; Smith, Wendy K. (2014). "Paradoxical Leadership to Enable Strategic Agility" (PDF). California Management Review. 56 (3): 58–77. doi:10.1525/cmr.2014.56.3.58. S2CID 56266128.
- Miron-Spektor, Ella; Ingram, Amy; Keller, Joshua; Smith, Wendy K.; Lewis, Marianne W. (2018). "Microfoundations of Organizational Paradox: The Problem Is How We Think about the Problem". Academy of Management Journal. 61 (1): 26–45. doi:10.5465/amj.2016.0594.
- Smith, Wendy K.; Lewis, Marianne W. (2022). Both/and Thinking: Embracing Creative Tensions to Solve Your Toughest Problems. Harvard Business Review Press. ISBN 978-1-64782-104-3.
