= Guy Pujolle =

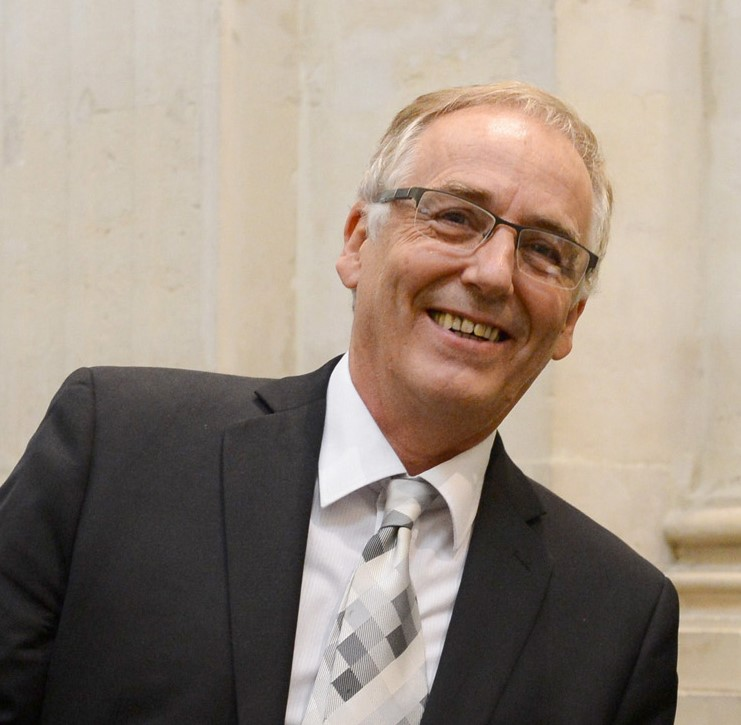
- Guy Pujolle (2016)
- Born: July 15, 1949 (age 77); Paris, France
- Education: Université Paris-Dauphine
- Awards: Seymour Cray Prize in 1991, Roberval Prize in 1995, French Academy of Sciences in 2013.
- Scientific career
- Workplaces: Pierre-and-Marie-Curie University
- Doctoral advisor: Alain Bensoussan

Guy Pujolle is a computer scientist working in the areas of computer networks and company founder .

Guy Pujolle is a computer science professor at Université Pierre-et-Marie-Curie during 1981-1993 and from 2000 to the present day, a member of the Royal Physiographic Society in Lund, Sweden, and a distinguished visiting professor at UFRJ (University Federal of Rio de Janeiro) from 2013. Before, he was a member of the Institut Universitaire de France from 2009 to 2014, a distinguished professor at the Division of IT Convergence Engineering of POSTECH, the Pohang University of Science and Technology, Korea, from 2011 to 2013. He was appointed by the Education Ministry to fund the Department of Computer Science at the University of Versailles, where he spent the period 1994-2000 as Professor and Head. He was Head of the CNRS MASI Laboratory, University Pierre-et-Marie-Curie, 1983–1993, Professor at ENST (École nationale supérieure des télécommunications), 1979–1981, and member of the scientific staff of INRIA (Institut National de la Recherche en Informatique et Automatique), 1974–1979.

Pujolle is the French representative at the Technical Committee on Networking at IFIP. He is an editor for ACM International Journal of Network Management, Telecommunication Systems, and Editor in Chief of Annals of Telecommunications. He was an editor for Computer Networks, Operations Research, Editor-In-Chief of Networking and Information Systems Journal, WINET, Ad Hoc Journal and several other journals.

He has received the Grand Prix of French Academy of Sciences in 2013. He was also a member of the Scientific Advisory Board of Orange/France Telecom Group during 1990-1998 and 2002–2010, and member of several scientific advisory boards.

Pujolle led the development of the first Gbps network to be tested in 1980. Among first steps in different technologies, he achieved the first pre-ATM prototype in 1981, first prototype of a networking piloting system using a knowledge plane in 1996, first patents and prototypes on DPI (Deep Packet Inspection) in 2000, first prototype of a Wi-Fi controller in 2000, first patents on network virtualization (migration and opening virtual networks on the fly) in 2008. He has also patents on metamorphic networks, green communications, and security in the Internet of Things.

He was chairman of the French Research Network REUNIR from 1987 to 1991, one out of the three members of the Wisdom Committee (Lars Backstrom, Brian Carpenter, Guy Pujolle) to decide on the future of TCP/IP in the European research network (decision January 22, 1990 to choose TCP/IP as the technology to be used for Europe instead of ATM). He was Chairman of the expert committee of the French Ministry of Telecommunications for Telecommunication regulation (1992-1998) and was Technical Chairman of the WLANSmartCard consortium for normalizing security and mobility in wireless LANs using a smartcard (2002-2006).

Pujolle has published widely in the area of computer systems modeling and performance, queueing theory, high-speed networks, intelligence in networking, wireless networks, and virtual networks. He has published 22 influential texts and monographs in these areas. He is a Professor Honoris Causa of BUPT (Beijing University of Posts and Telecommunications) since 1988, and Invited Professor of several Universities: NCSU, Stanford, UFRJ, Rutgers, UQAM, and POSTECH. He was awarded the Special Seymour Cray prize in 1991 for his research, and Silver Core from IFIP in 1995. Also in 1995 his book « Les Réseaux » was awarded the Roberval Prize in France for the best scientific book of the year (160 000 copies sold January 2016).

He is co-founder of QoSMOS, Ucopia Communications, EtherTrust, and Green Communications.
