= Interdisciplinary Center for Organizational Architecture =

Interdisciplinary Center for Organizational Architecture (ICOA) is a research center at Aarhus University, School of Business and Social Sciences in Aarhus, Denmark.

The Center for Organizational Architecture is a transdisciplinary partnership between research groups at Aarhus University, the Danish cross-ministerial innovation unit Mindlab and leading international researchers and institutions. The center works, in close dialogue with businesses and public organizations, with the design and redesign of organizations.

== Staff ==
- Børge Obel - Centre Director
- Rick L. Edgeman - Professor
- Jacob Kjær Eskildsen - Professor
- Anders Frederiksen - Professor
- René Franz Henschel - Professor
- Anne Bøllingtoft - Associate Professor
- Dorthe Døjbak Håkonsson - Associate Professor
- Lars Bach - Assistant Professor
- Jacob Brix - Assistant Professor
- Panagiotis Mitkidis - Assistant Professor
- Dan Mønster - Assistant Professor
- Elena Shulzhenko - Postdoc

In addition to this several PhD students

== Visiting Professors ==
- Richard M. Burton - Professor of Management and Organization at The Fuqua School of Business, Duke University
- Linda Argote - Professor of Organizational Behavior and Theory at Tepper School of Business, Carnegie Mellon University
- Charles Snow - Professor of Business Administration at Pennsylvania State University
- George Huber - Professor in Management at The University of Texas at Austin
- Fabian Lange - Assistant Professor of Economics at Department of Economics, Yale University

== See also ==
- Organizational architecture
