= Gerardine DeSanctis =

American organizational theorist (1954–2005)

Gerardine L. (Gerry) DeSanctis (January 5, 1954 – August 16, 2005) was an American organizational theorist and information systems researcher and Thomas F. Keller Professor of Business Administration at Duke University, known for her work on group decision support systems and automated decision support

== Biography ==
DeSanctis received degrees in psychology, a bachelor's from Villanova University and master's from Fairleigh Dickinson University. In 1982, she was granted a doctorate in management, with a focus on organizational behavior and information systems, from the Rawls College of Business at Texas Tech University.

DeSanctis joined the Fuqua School of Business at Duke University in 1992, where from 2001 to 2005 she was Professor of Business Administration at Duke University. She lectured in Duke's Global Executive MBA Program. She has been Visiting Professor at the Delft University of Technology, Erasmus University Rotterdam and INSEAD in France and in Singapore.

DeSanctis has been member of the editorial boards of Information Systems Research, Journal of Organizational Behavior, Management Science, MIS Quarterly, and Organization Science.

In 2004 DeSanctis was awarded the Maurice Holland Award. In 2007 the Organizational Communication & Information Systems (OCIS) has initiated the Gerardine DeSanctis Dissertation Award 2007.

== Work ==
DeSanctis authored and co-authored many publications. in the field on "learning in distributed teams and online communities".

=== Theories of technology ===
Theories of technology are adapted and augmented by researchers interested in the relationship between technology and social structures, such as information technology in organizations. DeSanctis and Poole proposed an "adaptive structuration theory" with respect to the emergence and use of group decision support systems. In particular, they chose Giddens' notion of modalities to consider how technology is used with respect to its "spirit". "Appropriations" are the immediate, visible actions that reveal deeper structuration processes and are enacted with "moves". Appropriations may be faithful or unfaithful, be instrumental and be used with various attitudes.

This theory of technology which are not defined or claimed by a proponent, but are used by authors in describing existing literature, in contrast to their own or as a review of the field. DeSanctis and Poole (1994) wrote of three views of technology's effects:

1. Decision-making: the view of engineers associated with positivist, rational, systems rationalization, and deterministic approaches
2. Institutional school: technology is an opportunity for change, focuses on social evolution, social construction of meaning, interaction and historical processes, interpretive flexibility, and an interplay between technology and power
3. An integrated perspective (social technology): soft-line determinism, with joint social and technological optimization, structural symbolic interaction theory

== Selected publications ==
- Burton, Richard M., Børge Obel, and Gerardine DeSanctis. Organizational design: A step-by-step approach. Cambridge University Press, 2011.

Articles, a selection:

- Desanctis, Gerardine, and R. Brent Gallupe. "A foundation for the study of group decision support systems." Management science 33.5 (1987): 589–609.
- Poole, Marshall Scott, and Gerardine DeSanctis. "Understanding the use of group decision support systems: The theory of adaptive structuration." Organizations and communication technology 173 (1990): 191.
- DeSanctis, Gerardine, and Marshall Scott Poole. "Capturing the complexity in advanced technology use: Adaptive structuration theory." Organization science 5.2 (1994): 121–147.
