= Charles A. O'Reilly III =

American professor of management

- Education: University of Texas at El Paso; University of California, Berkeley's Haas School of Business
- Occupation: Academic
- Employer: Stanford Graduate School of Business

Charles A. O'Reilly III is an American academic. He is the Frank E. Buck Professor of Management at the Stanford Graduate School of Business. He is the co-author of three books and a number of case studies as well as the co-editor of a fourth book.

== Early life ==
Charles A. O'Reilly III graduated from the University of Texas at El Paso, where he earned a bachelor of science degree in chemistry in 1965. He earned an MBA in information systems in 1971 and a PhD in organizational behavior and industrial relations from the Haas School of Business at the University of California, Berkeley.

== Career ==
O'Reilly was an assistant professor at the UCLA Anderson School of Management from 1976 to 1978. He taught at the Haas School of Business from 1979 to 1993, where he became a tenured professor. Since 1993, he has been the Frank E. Buck Professor of Management at the Stanford Graduate School of Business.

O'Reilly is the co-author of three books and the co-editor of a fourth book. He has published case studies about Cisco Systems and IBM. His first book, The Management of Organizations: Strategies, Tactics, Analyses, was published in 1989. In 1997, he published his second book, Winning Through Innovation: A Practical Guide to Managing Organizational Change and Renewal; the book highlights the importance of teamwork to foster innovation. His third book, Hidden Value: How Companies Get Extraordinary Results With Ordinary People, was published in 2000. His fourth book, Lead and Disrupt: How To Solve the Innovator's Dilemma, was published in 2016.

== Works ==
- Nadler, David A.; O'Reilly, Charles A. III; Tushman, Michael L., eds. (1989). The Management of Organizations: Strategies, Tactics, Analyses. Cambridge, Massachusetts: HarperCollins. ISBN 9780887303814. OCLC 19847949.
- O'Reilly, Charles A. III; Tushman, Michael L. (1997). Winning Through Innovation: A Practical Guide to Managing Organizational Change and Renewal. Cambridge, Massachusetts: Harvard Business School Press. ISBN 9781578518210. OCLC 475393023.
- O'Reilly, Charles A III; Pfeffer, Jeffrey (2000). Hidden Value: How Companies Get Extraordinary Results With Ordinary People. Cambridge, Massachusetts: Harvard Business School Press. ISBN 9780875848983.
- O'Reilly, Charles III; Tushman, Michael L. (2016). Lead and Disrupt: How To Solve the Innovator's Dilemma. Stanford, California: Stanford Business Books. ISBN 9780804798655. OCLC 949850232.

== See also ==
- Margaret Ann Neale
- Katherine W. Phillips
- Adam Galinsky
