= Richard M. Burton =

American organizational theorist

Richard Max Burton (born 1939) is an American organizational theorist and Emeritus Professor of Management and Organization at The Fuqua School of Business, Duke University, known for his work in the field on business strategy and organizational design.

== Life and work ==
Burton obtained his BS in Engineering Mechanics at the University of Illinois at Urbana–Champaign in 1961, where in 1963, he also obtained his MBA in Finance, and in 1967, his DBA in Managerial Economics and Production.

In 1965, Burton started his academic career as instructor in Industrial Administration at the University of Illinois at Urbana–Champaign. In 1970, he moved to the Duke University where he was Professor of Strategy and Organization from 1985 to 2013. Since 1999, he is also Professor of Management at the European Institute of Advanced Study in Management (EIASM) in Brussels, Belgium.

Together with Børge Obel, Burton is a founding partner of the organizational consulting company EcoMerc providing consulting services based on the academic research they have done. He was wlaos visiting professor at the Interdisciplinary Center for Organizational Architecture.

== Selected publications ==
- Burton, Richard M. Designing efficient organizations: Modelling and experimentation. Vol. 7. North Holland, 1984.
- Burton, Richard M., and Børge Obel. Strategic organizational diagnosis and design: Developing theory for application. Springer Science & Business Media, 1998.
- Burton, Richard M., Børge Obel, and Gerardine DeSanctis. Organizational design: A step-by-step approach. Cambridge University Press, 2011.

Articles, a selection:

- Burton, Richard M., and Børge Obel. "The validity of computational models in organization science: From model realism to purpose of the model." Computational & Mathematical Organization Theory 1.1 (1995): 57–71.
