= Jan Beyer Schmidt-Sørensen =

- Born: Jan Beyer Schmidt-Sørensen; Tønder, Denmark
- Education: Aarhus University and Aarhus School of Business
- Occupation: Director of Business Development at Aarhus Municipality

Jan Beyer Schmidt-Sørensen (January 17, 1958) is a Danish economist and former Director of Business Development at Aarhus Municipality.

== Biography ==
Jan Beyer Schmidt-Sørensen was born January 17, 1958, in Tønder. He grown up in Hadsund and Aalborg, and in 1976 he graduated from Hasseris High School in Aalborg. Afterwards he studied economics at Aarhus University. He graduated from Aarhus University in 1983 with a Master of Science in Economics. In 1990 he received a Ph.D. from Aarhus School of Business. In a period from 1983 to 1985, he was temporary assistant professor at Aarhus University under the state scientific secretary in Social Sciences. Between 1986 and 2001 he worked at Aarhus School of Business and occupied alternating positions respectively as PhD student, assistant professor, lecturer, head of institute, director of studies and dean. From 2001 to 2004, he was rector of Aarhus School of Business (now Aarhus University, School of Business and Social Sciences) in Aarhus. From 2005 to 2019 he held the post as director of business development of Aarhus Municipality. He ended his career as a strategic advisor in a business house for Central Denmark Region, after which he retired.

== Personal life ==
Jan Beyer Schmidt-Sørensen is married to the retired priest Edith Østergaard. Together they have three adult children and grandchildren.
