= Katherine W. Phillips =

American business theorist (1972–2020)

- Born: Chicago, Illinois
- Died: January 15, 2020
- Known for: diversity in the workplace research
- Spouse: Damon Phillips

Academic background
- Education: University of Illinois at Urbana–Champaign, Stanford University

Academic work
- Discipline: Business
- Sub-discipline: Leadership and Ethics
- Institutions: Columbia Business School
- Main interests: Workplace Diversity

Katherine Williams Phillips (March 4, 1972 – January 15, 2020) was an American business theorist and the Reuben Mark Professor of Organizational Character at Columbia University's Business School, where she worked from 2011 until her death in 2020. She headed the Sanford C. Bernstein & Co. Center for Leadership and Ethics at Columbia, and was Senior Vice Dean.

== Career ==
Born Katherine Y. Williams to Adolph Williams and Amelia (Rogers), Phillips was the youngest of six siblings. She grew up in a black Chicago neighborhood, and in the third grade, was chosen to attend a nearly all-white magnet school where she was one of the few black students. She graduated from the University of Illinois at Urbana-Champaign and earned a PhD from Stanford. She was a tenured professor at both the Kellogg School of Management at Northwestern University and the Columbia Business School. Phillips was known for her research into diversity in the workplace, demonstrating that diversity on teams leads to greater innovation and creativity. She was a Senior Vice dean at Columbia and had published collaborations with other faculty on Diversity and other topics. She was its Reuben Mark professor of organizational character. Her latest position was as the director of its Sanford C. Bernstein & Co. Center for Leadership and Ethics.

== Biography ==
She married fellow Stanford graduate and Columbia Business School professor Damon Phillips, the Lambert Family Professor of Social Enterprise at Columbia. Phillips was a three-time All American in Track and Field at the University of Illinois Urbana Champaign where she competed in the 400 m dash, long jump and relays.

== Honors ==
Named one of the "Top 40 Business School Professors Under the Age of 40" by Poets and Quants in 2011, Phillips was also an Academy of Management Fellow.

== Publications ==
- When surface and deep-level diversity collide: The effects on dissenting group members - Authors: Katherine W Phillips, Denise Lewin Loyd -Publication date:2006/3/1, Journal -Organizational behavior and human decision processes-Volume 99/Issue2
- Social category diversity promotes premeeting elaboration: The role of relationship focus - Authors:DL Loyd, CS Wang, KW Phillips, RB Lount Jr., Organization Science 24 (3), 757-772, 2013
- Expertise in your midst: How congruence between status and speech style affects reactions to unique knowledge - Authors:D Lewin Loyd, KW Phillips, J Whitson, MC Thomas-Hunt, Group processes & intergroup relations 13 (3), 379–395,2010
- Duo status: Disentangling the complex interactions within a minority of two - Authors: DL Loyd, J White, M Kern, KW Phillips, E Mannix, MA Neale, Research on Managing Groups and Teams, JAI Press, Amsterdam, 75–92, 2008
- Managing perceptions of ethical behavior in evaluative groups: The implications for diversity in organizations - Authors: DL Loyd, KW Phillips, Research on Managing in Groups and Teams 8, 225–45, 2006
- Social Similarity and Opinion Conflict: The Impact of Relationship Concerns - Authors: C Wang, K Williams Phillips, D Loyd, R Lount, IACM. 2006
- Reactions to Disagreement from an In-group Member: The Impact of Out-group Member Status - Authors: D Loyd, K Williams Phillips, SY Kim-Jun, SH Shim, MIT Sloan Research Paper, 2010
- Group Processes & Intergroup - Authors: DL Loyd, KW Phillips, J Whitson, MC Thomas-Hunt, Group Processes & Intergroup Relations 13 (3), 379–395, 2010.
- Negational categorization and intergroup behavior - Authors: CB Zhong, KW Phillips, GJ Leonardelli, AD Galinsky, Personality and Social Psychology Bulletin 34 (6), 793–806, 56 2008

== Death ==
Phillips died of breast cancer on January 15, 2020, at age 47. Phillips is survived by her husband and their two daughters.

== See also ==
- Margaret Ann Neale
- Adam Galinsky
- Charles A. O'Reilly III
