= Maurice Schweitzer =

American business professor

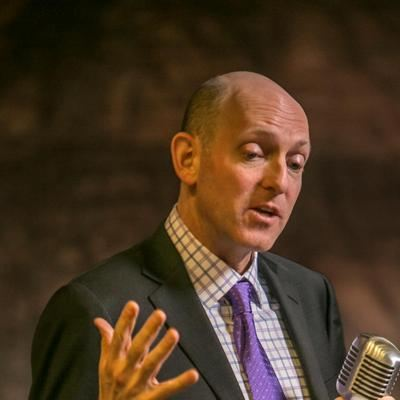
- Wharton University, University of Pennsylvania, lecture of Psychology
- Born: 1967 (age 58–59); Detroit, Michigan
- Education: University of California, Berkeley
- Scientific career
- Workplaces: Wharton School, University of Pennsylvania
- Website: oid.wharton.upenn.edu/profile/schweitz/

Maurice E. Schweitzer is Cecilia Yen Koo Professor, Professor of Operations and Information Management, at the Wharton School of Business at the University of Pennsylvania. Along with Adam Galinsky, he co-wrote Friend & Foe: When to Cooperate, When to Compete, and How to Succeed at Both (ISBN 0307720217).

== Biography ==
Maurice Schweitzer is the Cecilia Yen Koo Professor of Operations, Information, and Decisions and Management at the Wharton School at the University of Pennsylvania. He studies negotiations and decision making. He has won several best paper awards, teaching awards, and the Mentoring Award in the OB Division at the Academy of Management in 2018. He co-authored “Friend & Foe: When to Cooperate, When to Compete, and How to Succeed at Both.” Maurice is the Academic Director for Wharton's Effective Decision-Making Program, the Director of the Wharton Behavioral Lab, and he served as President of the International Association for Conflict Management in 2018.

In 2022, Maurice became a Fellow of the International Association for Conflict Management, and in 2024 he became a Fellow of the Academy of Management.

== Research ==
Maurice's work spans across several domains. In the field of Behavioral Operations, his co-authored work with Gerard Cachon investigates how people make newsvendor decisions. They found that people focus on trying to match demand rather than optimize profit (e.g., by ordering more of high-profit products and less of low-profit products).

Much of his work focuses on negotiations, with a forthcoming chapter titled "Negotiation" in the Handbook of Social Psychology (6th ed), and a recently published paper, "Embracing complexity: A review of negotiation research", with co-authors Erica Boothby and Gus Cooney.

Maurice's work also investigates humor. He published work in the Annual Review of Organizational Psychology and Organizational Behavior in 2024 with Cecily D. Cooper.

== Citations ==
As of April 1, 2025, Schweitzer's work has been cited over 19,000 times.

== Friend & Foe book ==
Maurice Schweitzer collaborated with Adam Galinsky to write their first book "Friend and Foe: When to Cooperate, When to Compete, and How to Succeed at Both". The book was published by Random House on September 29, 2015.
