= David A. Nadler =

American organizational theorist (1948–2015)

- Born: 1948
- Died: 2015 (aged 66–67)
- Education: BA International Affairs
- Alma mater: George Washington University's Elliott School of International Affairs
- Occupations: organizational theorist, consultant and business executive

David A. Nadler (1948–2015) was an American organizational theorist, consultant and business executive, known for his work with Michael L. Tushman on organizational design and organizational architecture.

== Biography ==
Nadler obtained his BA in International Affairs at George Washington University's Elliott School of International Affairs, his MBA from Harvard Business School and his MA and his PhD in Psychology at the University of Michigan.

After his graduation Nadler joined Columbia University, where he was appointed associate professor at the Columbia Business School in the early 1980s. In 1980 he was founding director of the consultancy firm Organization Research and Consultation which became the Delta Consulting Group, Inc., which was acquired by Mercer in 2000, and became Mercer Delta Consulting, LLC. In 2007 he became vice chairman of Marsh & McLennan Companies.

Nadler was elected member of the Academy of Management and Fellow at the American Psychological Association. in 2004 he was named by Consulting Magazine among the 25 most influential consultants in the United States.

== Selected publications ==
- Nadler, David, and Michael Tushman. Strategic organization design: Concepts, tools & processes. Scott Foresman & Co, 1988.
- Nadler, David, Marc S. Gerstein, and Robert B. Shaw. Organizational architecture: Designs for changing organizations. Vol. 192. Jossey-Bass Inc Pub, 1992.
- Nadler, David A. Discontinuous change: Leading organizational transformation. Jossey-Bass, Inc. Publishers, 1995.

Articles, a selection

- Tushman, Michael L., and David A. Nadler. "Information Processing as an Integrating Concept in Organizational Design." Academy of management review 3.3 (1978): 613-624.
- Tushman, Michael, and David Nadler. "Organizing for innovation." California management review 28.3 (1986): 74-92.
- Nadler, David A., and Michael L. Tushman. "Beyond the charismatic leader: Leadership and organizational change." The training and development sourcebook (1994): 278-292.
