= Damon Phillips =

Business professor

Damon J. Phillips
- Occupations: Professor, advisor
- Known for: business strategy, labor markets, and entrepreneurship
- Spouse: Kathy Phillips

Academic background
- Education: Morehouse College, Massachusetts Institute of Technology, Stanford University
- Thesis: The promotion paradox: The relationship between firm life chances and employee promotion chances in Silicon Valley law firms, 1946-1996 (1998)
- Doctoral advisor: Joel Podolny

Academic work
- Discipline: Business
- Sub-discipline: Entrepreneurship; Leadership and Ethics
- Institutions: Columbia Business School

Damon J. Phillips is an American business strategist, entrepreneurship scholar, sociologist, and a Professor of Management at the Wharton School, University of Pennsylvania. Prior to joining Wharton, he was the Lambert Family Professor of Social Enterprise at Columbia Business School.

== Career ==
Phillips graduated from Morehouse College, and holds graduate degrees from MIT and Stanford. Before academia, he worked at a family electronics manufacturing firm, which fueled his interest in business. From 1998 to 2011, he was professor at the University of Chicago Booth School of Business. From 2011 to 2021, he was the Lambert Family Professor of Social Enterprise at Columbia Business School.

== Biography ==
Phillips was born on Andrews Air Force Base, outside of Washington D.C. Because his father was in the military, the family moved several times during Phillips' childhood.

He was married to fellow Columbia Business School professor Kathy Phillips from August 1999 until her death in January 2020.

== Works ==
- Shaping Jazz, Princeton University Press, 2013. ISBN 9780691150888
- Kahl, Steven; Cusumano, Michael; Silverman, Brian S. (2012-09-03). "Orphaned Jazz: Short-Run Start-Ups and the Long-Run Success of Depression-Era Cultural Products". History and Strategy. Emerald Group Publishing. pp. 315–348. ISBN 978-1-78190-025-3.
