= Adam Galinsky =

American social psychologist (born 1969)

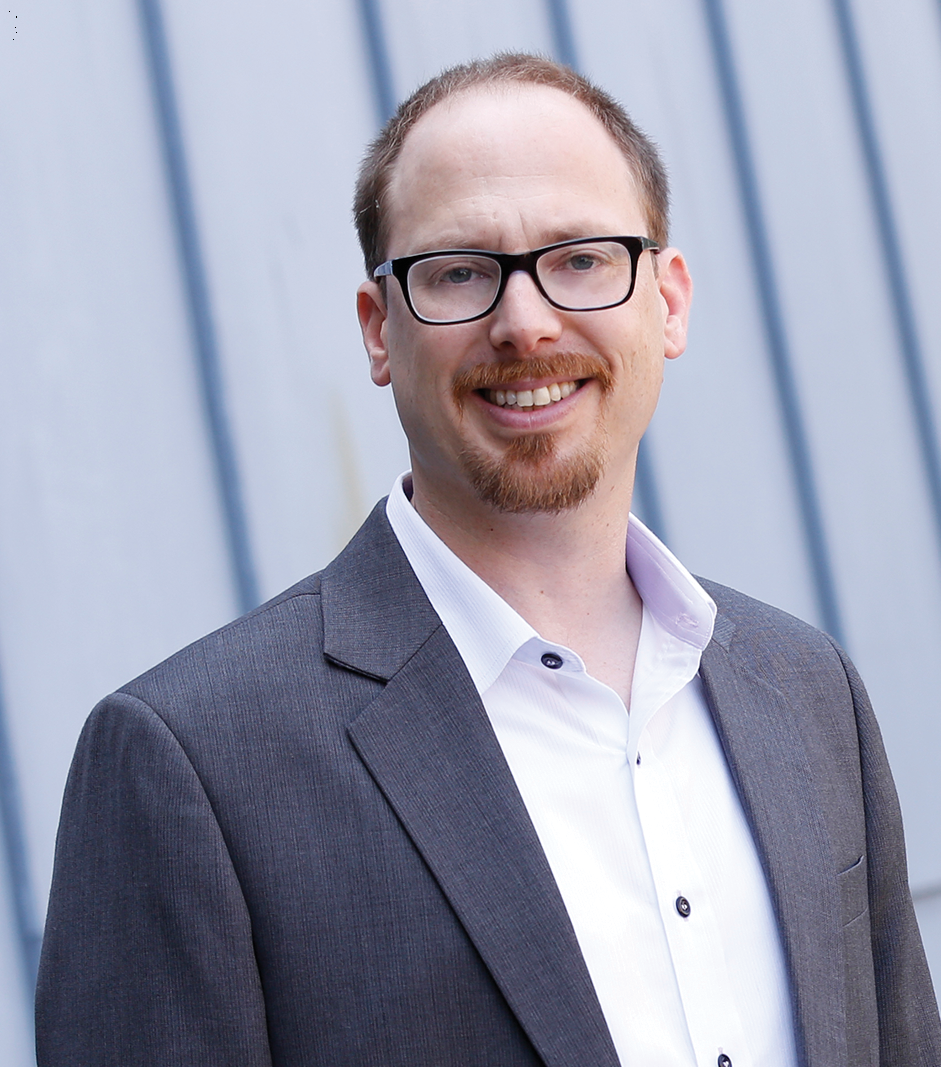
- Adam Galinsky at Columbia Business School 2014 annual meeting
- Born: 1969 (age 56–57)
- Education: Harvard University; Princeton University
- Scientific career
- Workplaces: Kellogg School of Management; Columbia Business School
- Website: www8.gsb.columbia.edu/cbs-directory/detail/ag2514

Adam Daniel Galinsky (born 1969) is an American social psychologist known for his research on leadership, power, negotiations, decision-making, diversity, and ethics. He is Vikram S. Pandit Professor of Business and Chair of Management Division at Columbia Business School.

With Maurice Schweitzer, he is co-author of Friend and Foe: When to Cooperate, When to Compete, and How to Succeed at Both (2015).

== Early life and education ==
Adam Galinsky is the son of Dr. David Galinsky and Dr. Maeda Galinsky, long-time professors of psychology and social work, respectively, at University of North Carolina. In high school, he lived with a family in Indonesia. His twin brother is the documentary filmmaker Michael Galinsky. Adam has collaborated with his brother as a producer on Michael's films.

Galinsky graduated cum laude with a B.A. in psychology from Harvard University. He received his M.A. and PhD in Social Psychology from Princeton University.

== Academic research and teaching ==
Prior to moving to Columbia Business School, Professor Galinsky's positions included Assistant Professorship of Management at David Eccles School of Business at the University of Utah and serving as Morris and Alice Kaplan Professor of Ethics and Decision in Management.

Galinsky has published more than 190 scientific articles, chapters, and teaching cases in the fields of management and social psychology. As of April 15, 2015, his h-index was 56 and his i10-index was 117, with 12,322 citations.

== Awards and recognition ==
Galinsky twice won the Chair's Core Course teaching award at Kellogg for teaching excellence on the topic of leadership. He also received a teaching award at Princeton University. In 2011, Professor Galinsky received the Ver Steeg Distinguished Research Fellow at Northwestern University, which is awarded to only one faculty member each year across the university.

== Friend and Foe ==
Adam Galinsky has collaborated with Maurice Schweitzer, Cecilia Yen Koo Professor of Operations and Information Management at the Wharton School at the University of Pennsylvania, to write his first book Friend and Foe: When to Cooperate, When to Compete, and How to Succeed at Both. The book was published by Random House on September 29, 2015.

== See also ==
- Margaret Ann Neale
- Katherine W Phillips
- Charles A. O'Reilly III
