= Margaret Ann Neale =

American management academic

- Education: University of Louisiana at Monroe; Virginia Commonwealth University; University of Texas at Austin
- Occupation: Academic
- Employer: Stanford Graduate School of Business

Margaret Ann Neale is an American academic. She is the Adams Distinguished Professor of Management, Emerita, at the Stanford Graduate School of Business, and the co-author of five books. She is also the co-director of the Stanford GSB Executive Program for Women Leaders.

== Education ==
Neale holds PhD in Business Administration, University of Texas, 1982, MS in Counseling Psychology, VA Commonwealth University, 1977, MS in Hospital Pharmacy Administration, Medical College of VA, 1974, and BS in Pharmacy, University of Louisiana at Monroe (formerly Northeast LA University), 1972.

== Selected publications ==
=== Books ===
- Neale, Margaret; Lys, Thomas (2015). Getting (More Of) What You Want: How the Secrets of Economics and Psychology Can Help You Negotiate Anything, in Business and in Life. Basic Books. ISBN 9780465050727.
- Bazerman, Max; Neale, Margaret (1992). Negotiating Rationally. Free Press. ISBN 9780029019856.

=== Articles, a selection ===
- Jehn, Karen; Northcraft, Gregory; Neale, Margaret (1999). "Why differences make a difference: A field study of diversity, conflict and performance in workgroups". Administrative Science Quarterly. 44 (4): 741–763. doi:10.2307/2667054. JSTOR 2667054. S2CID 16313675.

== See also ==
- Katherine W. Phillips
- Adam Galinsky
- Charles A. O'Reilly III
