= Agnès Sulem =

French applied mathematician

Agnès Sulem (born 1959) is a French applied mathematician whose research topics include stochastic control, jump diffusion, and mathematical finance.

== Education ==
Sulem earned a Ph.D. in 1983 at Paris Dauphine University, with the dissertation Résolution explicite d'Inéquations Quasi-Variationnelles associées à des problèmes de gestion de stock supervised by Alain Bensoussan.

== Career ==
She is a director of research at the French Institute for Research in Computer Science and Automation (INRIA) in Paris, where she heads the MATHRISK project on mathematical risk handling. She is currently a professor at the University of Luxembourg in the Mathematics department. She is a coauthor of the book Applied Stochastic Control of Jump Diffusions (with Bernt Øksendal, Springer, 2005; 2nd ed., 2007; 3rd ed., 2019). Sulem is also an associate editor at the Journal of Mathematical Analysis and Applications and at the SIAM Journal on Financial Mathematics.
