= Michael L. Tushman =

American organizational theorist

- Born: 1947 (age 78–79)
- Education: Northeastern University; Cornell University; Massachusetts Institute of Technology
- Occupation: Academic
- Employer: Harvard Business School

Michael L. Tushman (born 1947) is an American organizational theorist, management adviser, and Professor of Business Administration at Harvard Business School. He is known for his early work on organizational design with David A. Nadler, and later work on disruptive innovation, organizational environments, and organizational evolution. He is also co-founder and director of Change-Logic, a consulting firm based in Boston, US.

== Biography ==
Tushman obtained his BS in electrical engineering in 1970 at Northeastern University, and his MS in Organizational Behavior in 1972 at Cornell University. His graduate studies were at the Massachusetts Institute of Technology, where he obtained his PhD in Organization Studies in 1976. His thesis was entitled "Communications in Research and Development Organizations: An Information Processing Perspective," and his thesis committee consisted of Ralph Katz, Paul Lawrence and Edgar Schein.

After his graduation in 1976 Tusman started his academic career as an assistant professor of business at Columbia Business School, and eventually became an associate professor of business. In 1983 he was appointed professor of management, and from 1989 to 1998, was the Phillip Hettleman Professor of Management. In 1998 he moved to Harvard Business School, where he was appointed professor of management, and since 1999, the Paul R. Lawrence MBA Class of 1942 Professor of Business Administration. Over the years he was a visiting professor at MIT Sloan School of Management in 1982-83 and 1996; at INSEAD in 1995–98, and at Bocconi University in 2010–11.

In 1996 Tushman was elected Fellow of the Academy of Management; in 2005, Tushman was named Lecturer of the Year at CHAMPS, Chalmers University of Technology; in 2008 he received an honorary doctorate from the University of Geneva, where he was commended by the university as a scholar internationally recognized for his work on the relationships between technological change and organizational evolution; in 2011 he was given the Sumantra Ghoshal Award for Rigour & Relevance in the Study of Management from London Business School; in 2013 he was awarded the Academy of Management Career Achievement Award for Distinguished Scholarly Contributions to Management; also in 2013 he won the Academy of Management Review Decade Award for his paper with Mary J. Benner, “Exploitation, Exploration and Process Management: The Productivity Dilemma Revisited" (Academy of Management Review, 2003); In 2014 he was honored with the Lifetime Achievement Award from the American Society for Training and Development (ASTD), and also in 2014, Tushman was recognized as a Foundational Scholar in the Knowledge and Innovation Group of the Strategic Management Society .

== Selected publications ==
- Tushman, Michael L., and David A. Nadler. "Information Processing as an Integrating Concept in Organizational Design." Academy of management review 3.3 (1978): 613–624.
- Tushman, Michael L., and Philip Anderson. "Technological discontinuities and organizational environments." Administrative science quarterly (1986): 439–465.
- Anderson, Philip, and Michael L. Tushman. "Technological discontinuities and dominant designs: A cyclical model of technological change." Administrative science quarterly (1990): 604–633.
- Tushman, Michael L. "Winning through innovation." Strategy & Leadership 25.4 (1997): 14–19.
- O Reilly, Charles A., and Michael L. Tushman. "The ambidextrous organization." Harvard Business Review 82.4 (2004): 74–83.
- Tushman, Michael L.; O'Reilly, Charles A. (1996). "Ambidextrous Organizations: Managing Evolutionary and Revolutionary Change". California Management Review. 38 (4): 8–29. doi:10.2307/41165852. ISSN 0008-1256.
- Tushman, Michael L.; Smith, Wendy K.; Binns, Andrew (June 2011). "The Ambidextrous CEO". Harvard Business Review. Vol. 89, no. 6.
- Binns, Andrew; Harreld, J. Bruce; O'Reilly, Charles A.; Tushman, Michael L. (Winter 2014). "The Art of Strategic Renewal". MIT Sloan Management Review. Vol. 55, no. 2. pp. 21–23.
- O’Reilly III, Charles A.; Tushman, Michael L. (2016). Lead and disrupt: How to solve the innovator's dilemma. Stanford, Calif: Stanford University Press. ISBN 9781522689928.
- Tushman, Michael L.; Anderson, Philip (2018-12-20). "Technological discontinuities and organizational environments". Organizational Innovation. Routledge. pp. 345–372. doi:10.4324/9780429449482. ISBN 978-0-429-44948-2.
