= Bruno Solnik =

French professor

Bruno Solnik is a professor of finance at Hong Kong University of Science and Technology in Hong Kong. He was the academic director of the HKUST-NYU Master in Global Finance. He is also a distinguished emeritus professor of finance at HEC Paris.

== Early life and education ==
Solnik earned an engineering degree from École Polytechnique in Paris in 1968. He attended the Massachusetts Institute of Technology, completing a Ph.D. in finance in 1972. IN 1986, he was presented with a state doctorate in management from the Université de Paris Dauphine.

== Career ==
In 1969, Solnik was hired as a lecturer in economics at the University of Paris. In 1972, he moved to Stanford University as an assistant professor of finance. In 1974, he joined the HEC Paris, first as an associate professor, then a professor of finance, and later a distinguished emeritus professor. Solnik became a visiting professor at Hong Kong University of Science and Technology from 2006 to 2009, and later was appointed as a professor and academic director of the Master of Science in Global Finance program at that university.

He has also held visiting positions at University of Tokyo (Todai), University of New South Wales, University of Geneva, UCLA and University of California Berkeley.

Solnik researches trends in global finance, and has made a particular study of international diversification of investment.

Solnik is the founding president of the European Finance Association and director of the American Finance Association.

Solnik has written seven books, five in France and two in the USA, including Global Investments, a textbook in the field formerly titled International Investments, and translated into Japanese and Chinese. The sixth edition of Global Investments, coauthored by Dennis McLeavey of the CFA Institute, has been used for all three levels of the CFA examination. He has published some fifty articles in leading finance and economics journals such as the Journal of Finance, the Financial Analysts Journal, Journal of Financial and Quantitative Analysis, Journal of Economic Theory, Journal of International Money and Finance, etc. He also serves on the board of editors of several major Finance journals in America, Europe and Asia.

Solnik has served on the Council for Education and Research of the CFA Institute and on its Research Foundation. Awards include two Graham & Dodd Awards for Excellence by the Financial Analysts Journal, the "Finance Award of the Year" at the 1998 Interlaken Finance Symposium, and the Nicholas Molodovsky Award, presented by the CFA Institute in 1999. He is a Knight in the Order of the Legion of Honor.

== Publications: books ==
- Global Investments, Addison Wesley, 1988, 6th edition 2009 (with Dennis McLeavey, formerly titled, International Investments ). Translated into Japanese and Chinese. The book was used for all three levels of the CFA examination.
- Marchés Financiers: Gestion de Portefeuille et des Risques (with B. Jacquillat and C. Pérignon), Dunod, 1989, 4th edition 2004, 5th edition 2009, 6th edition 2014.
- Gestion Financière, Dunod, 1980, 6th edition 2001, translated in Korean.
- Système Monétaire International et Risque de Change, (with R. Roll), Economica, 1978.
- Les Marchés Financiers et la Gestion de Portefeuille, (with B. Jacquillat), Dunod, 1974, third edition 1982, translated into several languages.
- European Capital Markets; Towards a general theory of international investment, Lexington - D. C. Heath, 1973.
- La Programmation Linéaire, Dunod, 1969, seventh edition 1983, translated into several languages.

== Selected academic articles ==
- “Relative Optimism and the Home Bias Puzzle" (with Luo Zuo), Review of Finance, Vol. 21, Issue 5, 1 August 2017, pp. 2045–2074.
- ""International Correlation Asymmetries: Frequent-but-Small and Infrequent-but-Large Returns” (with Thaisiri Watewai), Review of Asset Pricing Studies, vol. 6, issue 2, December 2016, pp. 221–260.
- "A Global Equilibrium Asset Pricing Model with Home Preference" (with Luo Zuo), Management Science, Vol. 58, No. 2, February 2012, pp. 273–292.
- "Applying Regret Theory to Investment Choices: Currency Hedging Decisions", (with Sébastien Michenaud), Journal of International Money and Finance, September 2008.
- "What Determines Expected International Asset Returns" (with Campbel Harvey and Guofu Zhou), Annals of Economics and Finance, 3, 2002.
- "Global Pricing of Equity", (with Jeff Diermeier), Financial Analysts Journal, July/August 2001.
- "On the Term Structure of Default Risk Premia in the Swap and Libor Markets", (with Pierre Collin Dufresne), Journal of Finance, June 2001.
- "Extreme Correlation of International Equity Returns ", (with François Longin), Journal of Finance, April 2001.
- "Dispersion as Cross-Sectional Correlation", (with Jacques Roulet), Financial Analysts Journal, January/February 2000.
- "The Pricing of Domestic and Multinational Firms", (with Thierry Lombard and Jacques Roulet), Financial Analysts Journal, March/April 1999
- "Global Asset Management: To Hedge or not to Hedge", Journal of Portfolio Management, Summer 1998.
- "A Multi-country Test of the Fisher Model for Stock Returns", (with Vincent Solnik), Journal of International Financial Markets, Institutions and Money, December 1997.
- "The World Price of Foreign Exchange Risk: Some Synthetic Comments", European Financial Management, March 1997.
- "International Market Correlation and Volatility", (with Cyril Boucrelle and Yann Le Fur), Financial Analysts Journal, September/October 1996.
- "The World Price of Foreign Exchange Risk", (with B. Dumas), Journal of Finance, June 1995.
- "Is the Correlation in International Equity Returns Constant: 1960-1990?", (with F. Longin), Journal of International Money and Finance, February 1995.
- "Global Optimization for Swiss Pension Funds", (with Patrick Odier and Stéphane Zucchinetti), Finanzmarkt und Portfolio Management, Nr 2, 1995.
- "Why Not Diversify Internationally Rather Than Domestically?", Financial Analysts Journal, January/February 1995 (reprinted from 1974).
- "Currency Hedging and Siegel's Paradox: On Black's Universal Hedging Rule", Review of International Economics, 1(2), June 1993.
- "Lessons for International Diversification", (with P. Odier), Financial Analysts Journal, March/April 1993.
- "I Vantagi di una Diversificazione Internazionale nell'Ottica italiana", Economia & Management, 1993.
- "The Performance of International Asset Allocation Strategies Using Conditioning Information", Journal of Empirical Finance, March 1993.
- "Optimal Currency Hedge Ratios and Interest rate Risk" (with E. Briys), Journal of International Money and Finance, December 1992.
- "L' Intérêt d'une Diversification Internationale", Revue d'Economie Financière, 19, Winter 1991.
- "International Diversification for Swiss Pension Funds", Finanzmarkt und Portfolio Management, (with P. Odier and J.M. Mivelaz), vol 5(1), 1991.
- "Finance Theory and Investment Management", Swiss Journal of Economics and Statistics, vol 127(3), 55-79, January 1991.
- "El Effecto Dia en la Bolsa de Paris", (with L. Bousquet), Revista de Economia, 688, December 1990.
- "The Distribution of Daily Stock Returns and Settlement Procedures : the Paris Bourse", Journal of Finance, December 1990.
- "Pacific Basin Stock Markets and International Diversification", in Research on Pacific Basin Stock Markets II, G. Rhee and R. Chang (eds), North Holland, 1990 (refereed proceedings).
- "Swap Pricing and Default Risk", Journal of International Financial Management and Accounting, vol 2, 79-91, 1990.
- "The Individuality of Universal hedging", (with M. Adler), Financial Analysts Journal, May/June 1990,.
- "Day-of-the-week Effect on the Paris Bourse", (with L. Bousquet), Journal of Banking and Finance, vol 14, 461-469, 1990.

== Honours ==
- European Finance Association, "Scroll to the Founding President" presented in Moscow, 2005.
- Knight in the Order of the Legion of Honor, 2005.
- Graham and Dodd Award for Excellence, CFA Institute, 2002.
- Nicholas Molodovsky Award, presented by the CFA InstituteMR Board of Governors on 22 May 1999.
- Prize Fondation HEC for the best article in Management, in 1998 for "Global Asset Management: To Hedge or not to Hedge", Journal of Portfolio Management, Summer 1998.
- The Finance Award of the Year, 1998, Finance Symposium Interlaken, 1998.
- Silver medal, CNRS, 1995.
- Knight in the National Order of Merit, 1995.
- Graham-Dodd Award for Excellence, CFA Institute, 1994.
- Best French Financial Economist, le Nouvel Economiste, 1993.
- First Prize, best article presented, INQUIRE (Europe), 1991.
- Prize for the best book in Financial Economics, L'Express, 1990.
- Prize for the best article, First International Conference on the Pacific Basin Markets, Taïpeï, 1989.
- Prize Fondation HEC for the best article in Management in 1983 for "The Relation Between Stock Prices and Inflationary Expectations: the International Evidence", Journal of Finance.
- Prize Harvard Business Review-l'Expansion for the best book in Finance published in 1982 (Marchés Financiers et Gestion de Portefeuille).
