= Department of Business Development and Technology (Aarhus University) =

- Institut for Forretningsudvikling og Teknologi
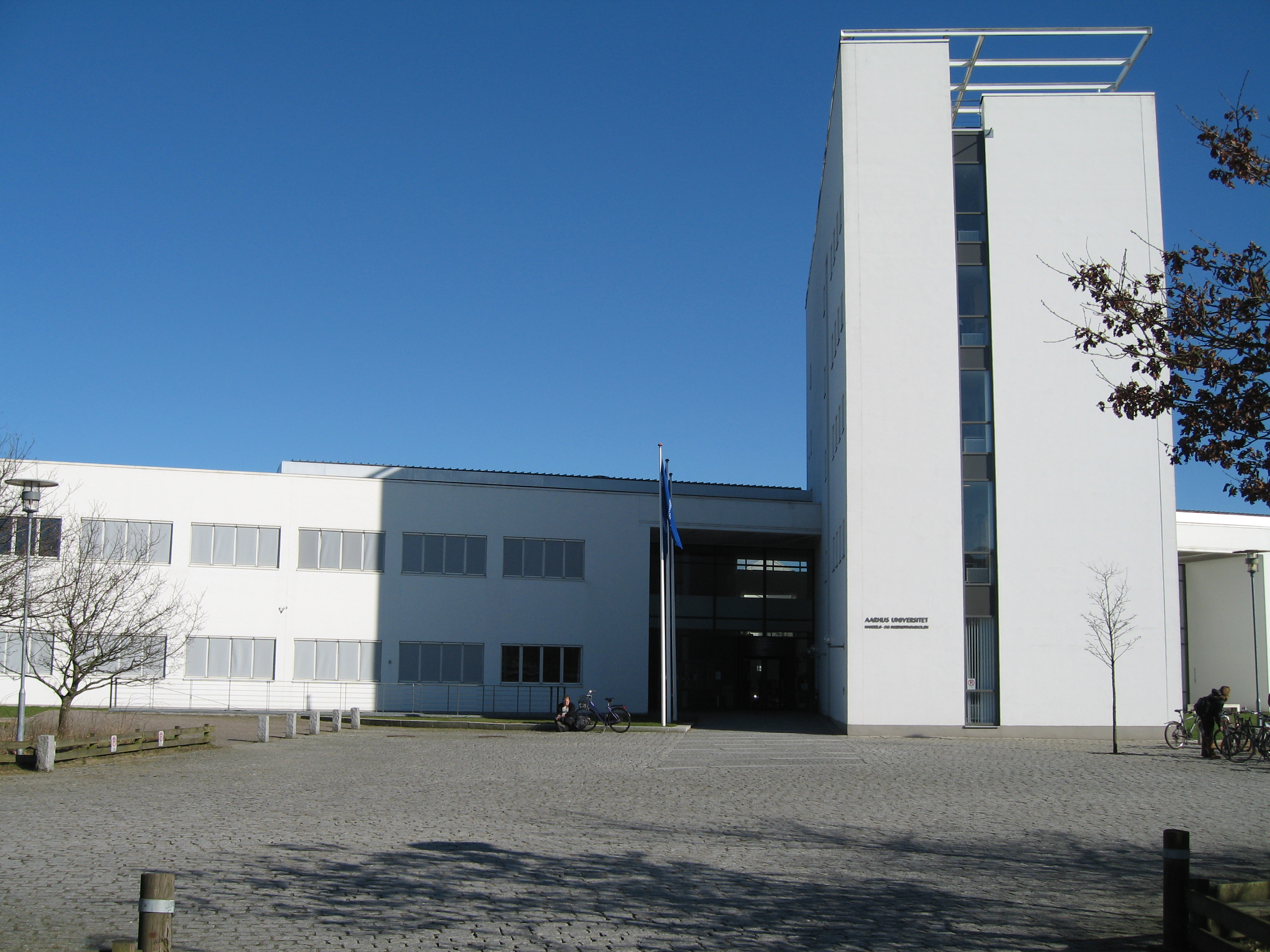
- Headquarters for BTECH, built in 1995.
- Type: Business and Engineering University
- Established: January 1, 1995
- Affiliations: Aarhus University, Aarhus BSS, AU Engineering
- Director: Anders Frederiksen
- Management Team: Team of four (Anders Frederiksen, Jan Laursen, Peter Lindgreen, Mikkel S. Nørgaard)
- Faculty: 225 (full-time and part-time)
- Students: 1,800
- Location: Herning, Denmark; 56°7′46″N 9°1′39″E
- Website: Department of Business Development and Technology

The Department of Business Development and Technology (or BTECH for short) is an academic department at Aarhus University, located in Herning, Denmark.

BTECH's focus is on education excellence and offers six undergraduate and two graduate study programmes as well as a number of part-time studies all within the fields of engineering, business economics, management and communication and multimedia.

The department has seen some heavy administrational re-organisations in the last decade or so.

== Organisation, research and study programmes ==
Department of Business Development and Technology is a department under Aarhus BSS, itself one of four academic departments of Aarhus University. Since 2012, BTECH has also been affiliated with AU Engineering, an organisation at Aarhus University focussing on engineering.

Apart from the educational activities, BTECH is home to a number of externally funded knowledge and research centres, including one Nordic Centre of Excellence. Research is anchored with four professorships and includes innovation and business development, entrepreneurship, energy technologies, IT development, climate adaptation and the wind energy industry.

BTECH has about 1,800 students (about sixty percent are full-time students and the rest are part-time students). Approximately 15% come from other countries than Denmark. Around 125 full-time employees, including technical and administrative personnel. Additionally, BTECH employs 100 part-time teachers.

BTECH’s study programmes are based on interaction across professional boundaries as well as close interaction with students and the surrounding business community. However, BTECH is also developing distance- and e-learning to provide educational opportunities in evolving markets. Furthermore, all study programmes have an innovative and international perspective. For example, approximately 40% of the students spend at least six months of their studies at a foreign engineering college, university or company.

=== Degree courses at BTECH ===
The following Bachelor and Master courses are offered in 2014:

- Bachelor of Science in Economics and Business Administration (HA int.)- taught in Danish
- Bachelor of Science in Economics and Business Administration (HA) - taught in English
- Bachelor of Engineering in Business Development - taught in Danish
- Bachelor of Engineering in Global Management and Manufacturing (GMM) - taught in English
- Bachelor of Engineering in Electronic Engineering (EDE) - taught in Danish
- Bachelor of Engineering in Electrical Energy Technology - taught in Danish
- Bachelor of Engineering in Mechanical Engineering - taught in Danish
- Bachelor of Science in Business Development Engineering (BDE)- taught in Danish
- Master of Science in Marketing and Business Innovation (cand.merc) - taught in English
- Master of Science in Engineering in Technology Based Business Development (cand.polyt) - taught in English

== History ==
BTECH was founded in 1995 as a merger between Engineering School Vestjysk Teknikum and the Business School Midtjysk Handelshøjskolecenter under the name Handels- og IngeniørHøjskolen (HIH), in English - Herning Institute of Business Administration and Technology (HIBAT).

A new residence, designed by famous Danish architect Henning Larsen, was erected at Birk Centerpark 15 in Herning.

When, by January 1, 2006, HIBAT merged with Aarhus University, the name was changed to Aarhus Universitet, Handels- og IngeniørHøjskolen (AU-HIH) (in English: Aarhus University, Institute of Business and Technology (AU-IBT)).

June 1, 2011, AU-IBT was changed - this time to AU Herning - a centre of the Faculty of Business and Social Sciences (Aarhus BSS) at Aarhus University.

In January 2012 the engineering organisation of AU Engineering at Aarhus University also became involved with the engineering educations in Herning and AU Herning changed name to Department of Business Development and Technology (BTECH).
