= Étienne Pardoux =

French mathematician

Étienne Pardoux (born 1947) is a French mathematician working in the field of stochastic analysis, in particular stochastic partial differential equations. He is currently Professor at Aix-Marseille University.

He obtained his PhD in 1975 at University of Paris-Sud under the supervision of Alain Bensoussan and Roger Meyer Temam.

Together with Peng Shige, he developed the Theory of nonlinear Backward Stochastic Differential Equations (BSDE).
