= Børge Obel =

Børge Obel (born 1948) is a Danish organizational theorist, Professor at European Institute for Advanced Studies in Management (EIASM) in Brussels, Belgium, and Professor at the Interdisciplinary Center for Organizational Architecture at Aarhus School of Business and Social Sciences, Aarhus University.

Obel was formerly Dean at the Aarhus School of Business as well as Professor in Management Science and Dean of the Social Science Faculty at University of Odense.

Obel is also an editor of several journals as well as a member of several Danish and international organizations and companies.

Obel was a founding board member of the Organizational Design Community.

Obel, together with Richard M. Burton, is a founding partner of the organizational consulting company EcoMerc providing consulting services based on the academic research they have done.
