= Annals of Telecommunications =

Peer-reviewed scientific journal

- Discipline: Telecommunications
- Language: English
- Edited by: Guy Pujolle

Publication details
- History: 1946-present
- Publisher: Springer Nature
- Frequency: Bimonthly
- Open access: Hybrid
- Impact factor: 2.2 (2025)

Standard abbreviations
- ISO 4: Ann. Telecommun.

Indexing
- ISSN: 0003-4347 (print); 1958-9395 (web)

Links
- Journal homepage; Online archive

Annals of Telecommunications is a bimonthly peer-reviewed scientific journal published by Springer Nature on behalf of the Institut Mines-Télécom. It covers all aspects of modern telecommunications. The editor-in-chief is Guy Pujolle (Sorbonne Université).

== Abstracting and indexing ==
The journal is abstracted and indexed in Scopus, CNKI, and the Science Citation Index Expanded. According to the Journal Citation Reports, the journal has a 2025 impact factor of 2.2.
