= Academy of Management Review =

- Discipline: Management
- Language: English
- Edited by: Kris Byron

Publication details
- History: 1976–present
- Publisher: Academy of Management (United States)
- Frequency: Quarterly
- Impact factor: 16.400 (2022)

Standard abbreviations
- ISO 4: Acad. Manag. Rev.

Indexing
- ISSN: 0363-7425
- JSTOR: 03637425
- OCLC no.: 231040504

Links
- Journal homepage; Online access; Online archive

The Academy of Management Review (AMR) is a peer-reviewed academic journal on management. According to the Journal Citation Reports, the journal's 2022 impact factor is 16.400, ranking it 3rd out of 227 journals in the categories "Management" and 4th out of 155 journals in the category of "Business". Incoming editor-in-chief is Kris Byron, taking over from Sherry M. B. Thatcher (University of Tennessee). The journal is indexed in Scopus.

AMR is one of the four general management journals that the UT Dallas uses to rank the research productivity of universities. Finally, AMR is on the Financial Times top 50 list with six other management journals.

AMR, by contrast with other sister journals of the Academy of Management, only publishes conceptual and theory pieces in the field of management, organization studies and applied psychology.
