= Peng Shige =

Chinese mathematician (born 1947)

- 彭实戈
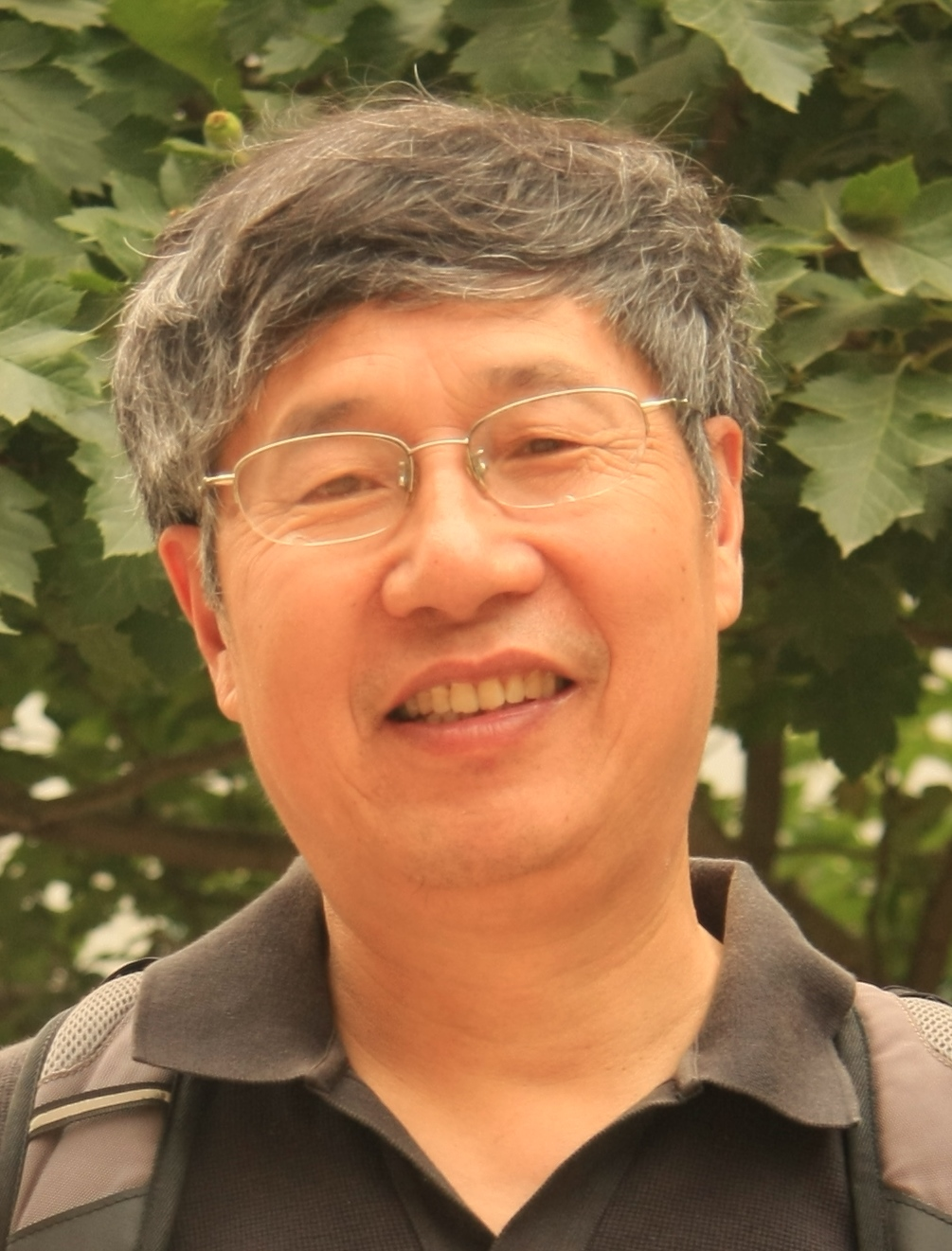
- Born: December 8, 1947 (age 78); Binzhou, Shandong, China
- Education: Shandong University; Paris Dauphine University; University of Provence; Fudan University
- Known for: BSDE; Mathematical Finance
- Scientific career
- Fields: Mathematics; Mathematical Finance
- Workplaces: Shandong University; Fudan University; Chinese Academy of Sciences

Chinese name
- Traditional Chinese: 彭實戈
- Simplified Chinese: 彭实戈
Transcriptions
Standard Mandarin
- Hanyu Pinyin: Péng Shígē

Peng Shige (Chinese: 彭实戈, born December 8, 1947, in Binzhou, Shandong) is a Chinese mathematician noted for his contributions in stochastic analysis and mathematical finance.

== Biography ==
Peng Shige was born in Binzhou and raised in Shandong, while his parents' hometown is Haifeng County in south-eastern Guangdong, he is a grandnephew of the famous revolutionary Peng Pai, and his grandfather (Peng Pai's brother) is also recognized a "revolutionary martyr" by the nation. He went to a countryside working with farmers as an "Educated youth" from 1968 to 1971, and studied in the Department of Physics, Shandong University from 1971 to 1974 and went to work at the Institute of Mathematics, Shandong University in 1978. In 1983 he took an opportunity to enter Paris Dauphine University, France, under the supervision of Alain Bensoussan, who was a student of Jacques-Louis Lions. He obtained his PhDs from Paris Dauphine University in 1985 and from University of Provence in 1986. Then he returned to China and did postdoctoral research at Fudan University before becoming a professor at Shandong University in 1990. In 1992 he was awarded the Habilitation à Diriger des Recherches by the University of Provence. He was promoted to Distinguished Professor of the Ministry of Education of China (Cheung Kong Scholarship Programme) in 1999.

== Academic contributions ==
Professor Peng generalized the stochastic maximum principle in stochastic optimal control. In a paper published in 1990 with Étienne Pardoux, Peng founded the general theory (including nonlinear expectation) of backward stochastic differential equations (BSDEs), though linear BSDEs had been introduced by Jean-Michel Bismut in 1973. Soon Feynman–Kac type connections of BSDEs and certain kinds of elliptic and parabolic partial differential equations (PDEs), e.g., Hamilton–Jacobi–Bellman equation, were obtained, where the solutions of these PDEs can be interpreted in the classical or viscosity senses. As a particular case the solution of the Black–Scholes equation can be represented as the solution of a simple linear BSDE, which can be regarded as a starting point of the BSDEs' applications in mathematical finance. A type of nonlinear expectation, called the g-expectation, was also derived from the theory of BSDEs. General theories of nonlinear expectations were developed later. These have various applications in utility theory, and the theory of dynamic risk measures.

== Honours ==
In 2005, Peng was elected as an academician of the Chinese Academy of Sciences.

On August 24, 2010, as one of the invited speakers, he gave a one-hour plenary lecture at the International Congress of Mathematicians at Hyderabad, India.

In 2011, he was appointed as "Global Scholars" for academic years 2011–2014 by Princeton University, hosted by the university's departments of mathematics, operations research and financial engineering, and the Program in Applied and Computational Mathematics, as he "is a global leader in the field of probability theory and financial mathematics."

In March 2015, as one of six or seven nominees, Peng was nominated for Abel Prize by Norwegian mathematician Bernt Øksendal.

In 2017 and again in 2021, he was a laureate of the Asian Scientist 100 by the Asian Scientist.

In September 2020, he was awarded Future Science Prize in mathematics and computer science.

In 2023, he was elected as a member of Academia Europaea.
