= Jay R. Galbraith =

American organizational theorist (1939–2014)

Jay Robert Galbraith (Feb. 26, 1939 – April 8, 2014) was an American organizational theorist, consultant, and professor at the International Institute for Management Development, known for his work on strategy and organization design.

== Biography ==
Born in Cincinnati, Ohio, Galbraith obtained his BSc in chemical engineering in 1962 at the University of Cincinnati, his MBA at the Indiana University Bloomington in 1964, and his PhD in Business Administration. His thesis was entitled "Motivational Determinants of Job Performance: An Empirical Study."

Galbraith had started his academic career as Instructor at the Indiana University in 1964. In 1966 he moved to MIT Sloan School of Management, where he was appointed assistant professor and became associate professor in 1970. From 1962 to 1966 he was professor at the European Institute of Advanced Studies in Management, Brussels. From 1974 to 1978 he was professor at the Wharton School of the University of Pennsylvania, and from 1986 to 1995 professor of clinical management at the USC Marshall School of Business and senior research scientist at its Center for Effective Organizations. In Lausanne, Switzerland he was professor at the International Institute for Management Development from 1995 to 2000, where he became professor emeritus in 2000. Back in the United States, he rejoined the USC Center for Effective Organizations as senior research scientist.

In 1978 Galbraith had started his own consultancy firm Jay R. Galbraith Management Consultants Ltd. He had been awarded the McKinsey Foundation Doctoral Thesis Award - First Prize in 1967, and the Crystal Apple Award by the Association for the Management of Organization Design in 1994. His book Organization Design was elected "Outstanding Book on Organization in 1976 - 1977" by the Organization Development Council in 1977, and his Organizing for the Future, was second in the Industry Week's top ten books of the year 1993.

== Work ==
=== Organizational architecture ===
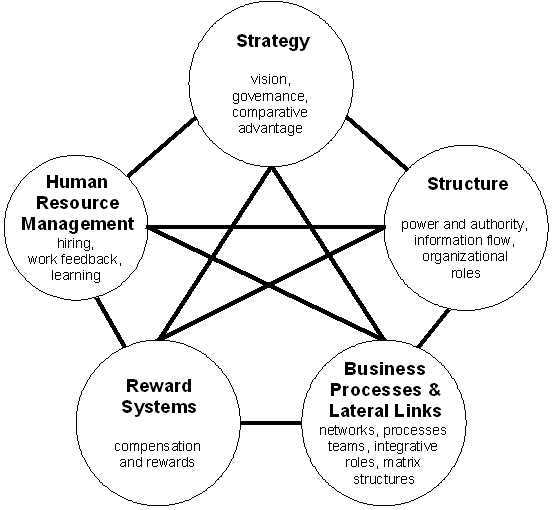
Galbraith's Star Model of organizational design

Organization design can be defined narrowly as the process of reshaping organization structure and roles. More effectively, it can be defined as the alignment of structure, process, rewards, metrics, and talent with the strategy of the business. Jay Galbraith and Amy Kates have made the case persuasively (building on years of work by Galbraith) that attention to all of these organizational elements is necessary to create new capabilities to compete in a given market. This systemic view, often referred to as the "star model" approach, is more likely to lead to better performance.

Organization design may involve strategic decisions, but is properly viewed as a path to effective strategy execution. The design process nearly always entails making trade-offs of one set of structural benefits against another. Many companies fall into the trap of making repeated changes in organization structure, with little benefit to the business. This often occurs because changes in structure are relatively easy to execute while creating the impression that something substantial is happening. This often leads to cynicism and confusion within the organization. More powerful change happens when there are clear design objectives driven by a new business strategy or forces in the market that require a different approach to organizing resources.

== Selected publications ==
- Galbraith, Jay R. Designing complex organizations, Addison-Wesley Longman Publishing Co., Inc., 1973.
- Galbraith, Jay R. Organization design, Reading, MA: Addison-Wesley, 1977.
- Galbraith, Jay R., and Daniel A. Nathanson. Strategy implementation: The role of structure and process, St. Paul, MN: West Publishing Company, 1978.
- Galbraith, Jay R., and Edward E. Lawler. Organizing for the future: The new logic for managing complex organizations, San Francisco: Jossey-Bass, 1993.
- Galbraith, Jay R. Designing organizations: An executive briefing on strategy, structure, and process, Jossey-Bass, 1995.
- Galbraith, Jay R. Designing the Customer-Centric Organization: A Guide to Strategy, Structure, and Process, Jossey-Bass, 2005.

=== Selected articles ===
- Galbraith, Jay R. "Organization design: An information processing view", Interfaces 4.3 (1974): 28-36.
- Edström, Anders, and Jay R. Galbraith. "Transfer of managers as a coordination and control strategy in multinational organizations", Administrative science quarterly (1977): 248-263.
