= Aarhus University School of Business and Social Sciences =

Danish business school

Aarhus BSS
- Type: Business School
- Established: 2007; 19 years ago (1928; 98 years ago)
- Affiliations: EUA, Triple Crown Accreditation
- Dean: Thomas Pallesen (dean of Aarhus BSS)
- Faculty: 737
- Students: 16,000
- Location: Aarhus and Herning, Denmark; 56°09′N 10°13′E
- Website: bss.au.dk
- Location in Denmark

The Aarhus University School of Business and Social Sciences (branded as Aarhus BSS) is one of the four faculties of Aarhus University in Denmark. The school consists of seven departments: Economics and Business Economics, Management, Political Science, Law, Business Communication, Psychology and Behavioural Sciences and Department of Business Development and Technology (located in the city of Herning). The main campus is located in Aarhus.

Aarhus BSS is a merger from 2007 and teaches programmes at Bachelor's, Master's and PhD level along with the MBA (Master of Business Administration), EMBA (Executive MBA) programmes and Summer University and Winter school courses. In 2010 Dale T. Mortensen, a Niels Bohr Visiting professor at Aarhus University, received the Nobel Prize in Economic Sciences together with his colleagues Peter Diamond and Christopher Pissarides.

== History ==
The history of the Aarhus BSS is both old and new. On 1 January 2007, Aarhus School of Business (Danish: Handelshøjskolen; ASB) merged into Aarhus University. In 2011, the Aarhus School of Business and the Faculty of Social Sciences at Aarhus University were merged under the name of Aarhus University, School of Business and Social Sciences. Aarhus School of Business had been founded in 1939, and the Faculty of Social Sciences consisted of several departments and faculties established between 1936 and 1969. The 2011 merger made Aarhus BSS one of the largest business schools in Europe.

The Aarhus School of Business's predecessor, The Jutland Business School (Danish: Den Jyske Handelshøjskole; DJH), has a somewhat more extensive history. Already in the late 1800s, DJH provided business programmes to young people from Jutland who wished to follow studies within business, economics and trade. The Aarhus School of Business continually grew since its founding. In 1968 Aarhus School of Business moved from the original location downtown Aarhus to the yellow and red brick buildings which house the Aarhus School of Business today.

Thomas Pallesen is Dean of Aarhus BSS. The school's Executive Team is formed by the Dean, the Vice-Dean for research and talent development, Per Baltzer Overgaard and the Vice-Dean for education, Peder Østergaard.

== Campus and student life ==
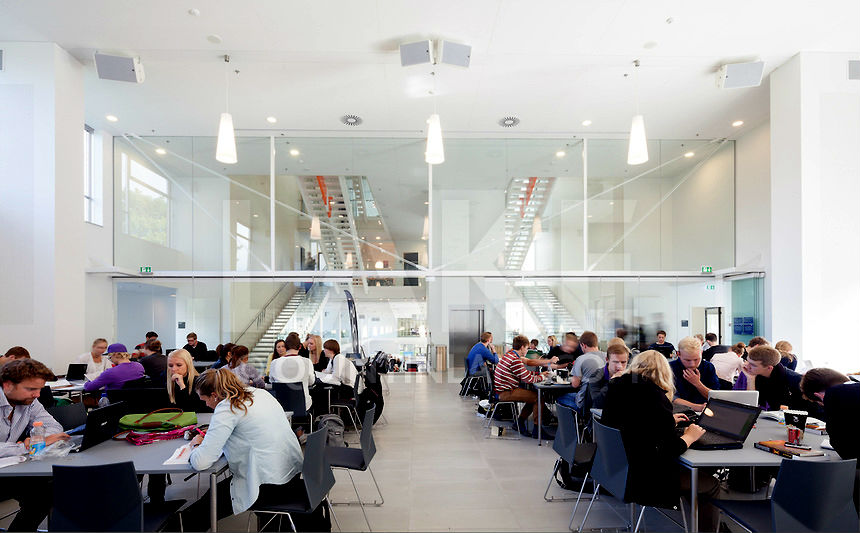
Students at work on Aarhus BSS main campus.

The School of Business and Social Sciences has its main campus around University Park, the Nobel Park, and campus Fuglesangs Allé, all located in the centre of Aarhus. In 2006, the Institute of Business and Technology in Herning (now AU Herning) was merged with Aarhus University, adding Birk Centerpark in Herning to the campus sites of School of Business and Social Sciences.

The campuses in Aarhus and Herning offer a number of facilities, including Aarhus University Sport (AUS) which hosts more than 16 different sports activities and Denmark's biggest Sports Day and Friday Bar, libraries on all campus sites, student organisations like Studenterlauget and the Student Council, and cafeterias and cafes like Dale's café, Aarhus Student House and Klubben.

Accommodation at the university is possible in the University Park Dormitories.

== Degree programmes ==
=== Bachelor's degree programmes ===
- Business Administration, BA soc. (taught in Danish)
- Business Administration and Commercial Law (taught in Danish)
- Business Development Engineer (BDE) - in Herning (taught in Danish)
- Economics and Business Administration, BSc
- Economics and Business Administration, BSc - in Herning
- Economics and Business Administration, HA (taught in Danish)
- Economics and Business Administration, HA - in Herning (taught in Danish)
- Economics and Management (taught in Danish)
- Global Management and Manufacturing - in Herning
- Law (taught in Danish)
- Political Science (taught in Danish)
- Psychology (taught in Danish)
- Public Policy (taught in Danish)
- Social Science (taught in Danish)

=== MSc programmes in economics and business administration ===
- Business Intelligence
- Business-to-Business Marketing and Purchasing
- Commercial and Retail Management
- Finance
- Finance and International Business
- Information Management
- Innovation Management and Business Development
- International Business
- International Business Development - in Herning
- International Economic Consulting
- Management Accounting and Control
- Marketing
- Operations and Supply Chain Analytics
- Strategic Communication
- Strategy, Organisation and Leadership

=== Master's degree programmes in other programmes ===
- Business Economics and Auditing, MSc (taught in Danish - cand.merc.aud.)
- Business Administration (taught in Danish - cand.soc.)
- Business Administration and Commercial Law, MSc (taught in Danish - cand.merc. (jur.))
- Economics and Management
- Information Technology - IT, Communication and Organisation, MSc (taught in Danish - cand.it)
- Information Technology - IT, Communication and Organisation, MSc - in Herning (taught in Danish - cand.it)
- Law (taught in Danish)
- MSc in engineering in Technology Based Business Development - in Herning
- Psychology (taught in Danish)
- Political Science
- Political Science (taught in Danish)
- Quantitative Economics
- Social Science (taught in Danish)

=== MBA programmes ===
School of Business and Social Sciences also teaches a one-year full-time MBA (Master in Business Administration) which integrates both sustainability and personal development into all courses. 25 applicants are admitted to the MBA programme every year.

The school also offers a two-year Executive MBA in Change Management and Leadership aimed at experienced managers. During the programme, managers will go on study trips to Stanford University and a university in Asia.

=== PhD programmes ===
Graduate School of Business and Social Sciences offers the following seven PhD programmes:

- Management
- Business Development and Technology
- Economics and Business Economics
- Law
- Political Science
- Psychology and Behavioural Sciences
- Social Science and Business

All programmes, except Social Science and Business (3-year scheme) are available as 3-year, 4-year, and 5-year schemes.

== Rankings ==
In 2016, Aarhus BSS is ranked no. 79 in the Financial Times ranking of business schools as well as no. 68 in the Master in Management ranking. Aarhus University is ranked no. 97 on the Leiden Ranking, no. 86 on National Taiwan University Ranking, no. 65 on Shanghai Academic Ranking of World Universities (ARWU), no. 117 on QS World University Ranking and no. 98 on Times Higher Education World University Ranking.

== Accreditations ==
Aarhus BSS holds the EFMD (European Foundation for Management Development) Equis accreditation, the Association to Advance Collegiate Schools of Business (AACSB) and the Association of MBAs (AMBA). This makes the school one of the few to have the so-called Triple Crown accreditation.

Aarhus BSS is a member of PRME, the UN-funded network consisting of business schools and universities which are all committed to integrating a number of principles for sustainability and social responsibility into their research and educational activities. So far, more than 300 institutions of higher education have joined the network.

== Notable alumni ==
Aarhus BSS has a large network of alumni (former students) gathered in the network of AU Alumni, which aims at creating and maintaining relations between students, staff, faculty and alumni.

Notable alumni:

- Anders Fogh Rasmussen, (MSc in economics 1978) Prime Minister of Denmark from 2001 until 2009. Secretary General of NATO since August 2009.
- Bjørn Lomborg, (MSc in political science 1991) Danish author, academic and environmentalist.
- Crown Prince Frederik, (MSc in political science 1995) Crown Prince of Denmark.
- Dan Jørgensen, (MSc in political science) Danish politician. Member of the European Parliament since 2004.
- Henrik Poulsen, (MSc in finance) CEO of DONG Energy and former CEO of TDC.
- Jan Beyer Schmidt-Sørensen, (Ph.D. in economics in 1990) director of business development at Aarhus Municipality and former rector of Aarhus School of Business
- Jesper Højer, former CEO of Lidl.
- Jørgen Vig Knudstorp, (MSc 1995, PhD in 1998 in economics) CEO of the Lego Group
- Lars Rohde, (MSc in economics), since 2013 CEO of the Danish National Bank
- Queen Margrethe II of Denmark from 1972 to 2024, studied political science in 1961–62.
- Søren Gade, (MSc in economics 1990) Danish politician, Minister of Defence and Member of the Danish Parliament.
- Svend Auken, (MSc in political science 1969) Danish politician. Chairman of the Danish Social Democrats 1987–1992.
- Tøger Seidenfaden, (MSc in political science 1983) Danish journalist. editor-in-chief at Politiken 1993–2011.
- Yildiz Akdogan, (MSc in political science 2006) Danish politician, Member of the Danish Parliament since 2007.
- Alexander Shenderyuk-Zhidkov, Russian politician, Senator since 2022, studied European Business and Law in 2004.
