= Social information processing (theory) =

Theory of human interactions

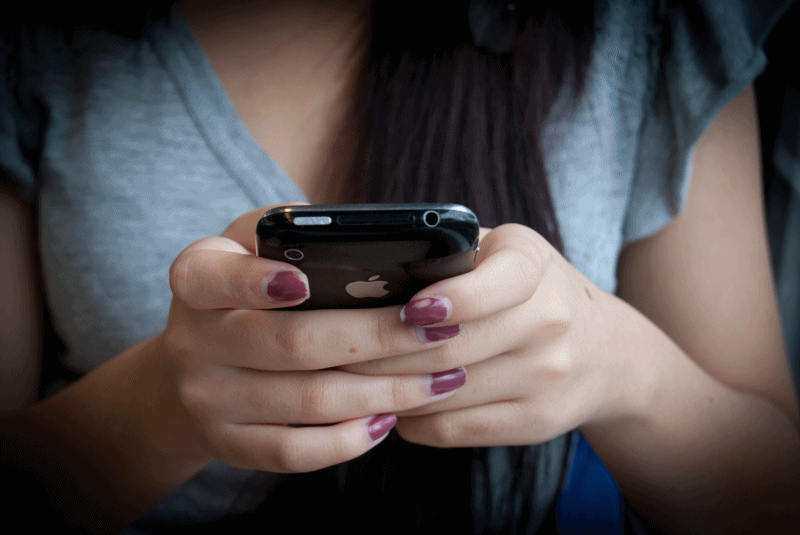
Computer-mediated communication has become easier and more convenient with the advent of smartphones.

Social information processing theory, also known as SIP, is a psychological and sociological theory originally developed by Salancik and Pfeffer in 1978. This theory explores how individuals make decisions and form attitudes in a social context, often focusing on the workplace. It suggests that people rely heavily on the social information available to them in their environments, including input from colleagues and peers, to shape their attitudes, behaviors, and perceptions.

Joseph Walther reintroduced the term into the field of interpersonal communication and media studies in 1992. In this work, he constructed a framework to explain online interpersonal communication without nonverbal cues and how people develop and manage relationships in a computer-mediated environment. Walther argued that online interpersonal relationships may demonstrate the same or even greater relational dimensions and qualities (intimacy) as traditional face-to-face (FtF) relationships. However, due to the limited channel and information, it may take longer to achieve than FtF relationships. These online relationships may help facilitate interactions that would not have occurred face-to-face due to factors such as geography and intergroup anxiety.

== Overview ==
=== Origins ===
The term Social Information Processing Theory was originally titled by Salancik and Pfeffer in 1978. They stated that individual perceptions, attitudes, and behaviors are shaped by information cues, such as values, work requirements, and expectations from the social environment, beyond the influence of individual dispositions and traits. Later, they renamed their theory to the Social Influence model.

At the start of the 1990s, after the advent of the Internet and the World Wide Web, interest grew in studying how the Internet impacted the ways people communicate with each other. Joseph Walther, a communication and media theorist, said that computer-mediated communication (CMC) users can adapt to this restricted medium and use it effectively to develop close relationships. Walther understood that describing the new nature of online communication required a new theory. Social information processing theory focuses on the social processes that occur when two or more people are engaged in communication, similar to theories such as social presence theory, social penetration theory, and uncertainty reduction theory. What makes SIP different from these theories is its distinct focus on communication mediated solely by information and communications technologies. While other media theories exist, such as media richness theory and uses and gratifications theory, SIP specifically focuses on relationships entirely mediated online.

=== The cues filtered-out theories ===
Unlike some theories that are rooted in other theoretical perspectives from various fields of study (e.g., Communication Accommodation Theory), SIP was conceptualized, in part, by addressing the shortcomings of other theories that addressed communication mediums. These theories are termed cues filtered-out theories. Cues filtered-out theories refer to theories that address the lack of nonverbal cues as being detrimental to online relationship development. Before Social Information Processing, many theorists believed that the lack of nonverbal cues would hinder the process of forming impressions and communicating accurately. They found that norms for interactions would be unclear via social networking sites. Moreover, these theorists believed that these communication blips would cause hostile communication and create a weak environment for relationship building.

Walther's research critiqued past methodological and conceptual problems with theoretical thinking. Walther states that often, online communication feels cold and impersonal, yet so can FtF. But, with this, Walther challenges past theorists by stating that, yes, online communication can be warm. Walther believes that the loss of nonverbal cues is not inherently fatal to defining our impression of others, unlike previous theorists believe. He subsequently worked toward establishing an interpersonal communication theory that more accurately reflected the intersection among communication, online environments, the self, and relationships. Two of these theoretical perspectives that influenced Walther's theory are social presence theory (SPT) and media richness theory (MRT). Walther believes that both SPT and MRT suffer from a limited understanding of relational life online. He argues that if interactants communicate enough times and with sufficient breadth and depth, nonverbal communication does not remain paramount in relationship development.

=== Forms of Self ===
One of the most important aspects of online interaction is the presentation of Self.

In 1987, Tory Higgins developed the self-discrepancy theory, and described three main forms of self: actual self, ideal self, and ought self. Actual self is the set of qualities and characteristics that a person actually possesses, the ideal self contains the attributes that a person hopes to someday achieve, and the ought self contains the attributes that a person believes he or she should possess. Higgins also explored the inconsistencies between them and found they are associated with emotional discomforts (e.g., fear, threat, restlessness).

Carl Rogers (1951) posited that there was another form of self, one that is not concerned with the future like the ideal and ought self. He called it the true self: a present form of self that exists psychologically and is not always fully expressed within social settings like the actual self.

Bargh, McKenna, and Fitzsimons (2002) conducted an experiment to test how the actual self and true self are expressed by people in face-to-face and computer-mediated interactions. Bargh et al. found that the actual self was more accessible following an initial face-to-face interaction, while the true self was more accessible following an initial interaction online. From the results of their study, the researchers concluded that people tend to like each other better when they meet online instead of meeting face-to-face.

These selves are manifested and are of particular importance in online conversations and relationships, allowing an individual to manage his or her online persona or identity.

=== Assumptions ===
Social information processing researchers like Joseph Walther are intrigued by how identities are managed online and how relationships are able to move from one of superficiality to one of intimacy. Three assumptions related to SIP theory are listed below:

- Computer-mediated communication provides unique opportunities to connect with people.

The first assumption rests on the premise that computer-mediated communication is a unique opportunity to build interpersonal relationships with others. CMC systems are vast and almost always text-based. It has been identified as "an organic setting" and can be synchronous or asynchronous. CMC is clearly different from face-to-face communication, but it offers an unparalleled opportunity to meet someone whom you would usually never meet face-to-face (FtF). Moreover, relationships established via CMC systems also prompt emotions and feelings we find in all relationships. Finally, since CMC systems are available around the globe, the uniqueness of being able to cultivate online relationships with someone who is very far away cannot be ignored. Walther suggests that hyperpersonal communication can improve relationships between groups with a history of conflict. Walther notes that visual identifiers (like turbans or race) need not be visible during hyper personal interactions. Which in turn, may promote identification of similarities. However, Walther notes that online communication is not a magical cure for intergroup hostility.

- Online communicators are motivated to form (favorable) impressions of themselves to others.

The second assumption alludes that impression management is essential in online relationships and participants undertake efforts to ensure particular impressions. On social networking sites (SNS) like FaceBook, people wish to provide an image of their ideal self. This is called "selective self presentation." During this process, people put together a profile that makes them appear more desirable, in turn, making them more attractive.

- Online interpersonal relationships require extended time and more accumulated messages to develop equivalent levels of intimacy seen in FtF interpersonal relationships.

The third assumption of SIP states that different rates of information exchange and information accrual affect relationship development. SIP theory suggests that although the messages are verbal, communicators "adapt" to the restrictions of online medium, look for cues in the messages from others, and modify their language to the extent that the words compensate for the lack of nonverbal cues. This third assumption reflects Walther's contention that given sufficient time and accrual of messages, online relationships have the same capacity to become intimate as those that are established face-to-face. In addition, online comments are usually delivered rather quickly and efficiently. Further, these messages "build up" over time and provide online participants sufficient information from which to begin and develop interpersonal relationships.

== Key concepts and features ==
=== Hyperpersonal perspective ===
==== Three phases of CMC ====
Social information processing theory describes computer-mediated communication as a process including three phases: impersonal, to interpersonal, and finally to hyperpersonal.

In the impersonal phase, due to the lack of nonverbal cues, CMC is believed to be more task-oriented than traditional face-to-face communication. Since the content is not influenced by social and emotional influence, it can avoid overly personal interpersonal interaction, promote rationality by providing essential discipline, facilitate the efficiency of group work through getting rid of peer pressure and hierarchy, and ultimately, create a more "democratic" atmosphere within organizations.

In the interpersonal phase, the nonverbal cues are lean and as the communication time increases, the exchange of social information increases accordingly. The anticipation of future communication may cause communicators to look for more information about the other. This mechanism leads to similar immediacy, similarity, composure, and receptivity as in FtF communication.

In the hyperpersonal phase, the sender uses the process of selective self-presentation. People who meet online have a better opportunity to make a favorable impression on the other. This is because the communicators can decide which information they would like to share about themselves by controlling their self-presentations online, giving them the power to disclose only their good traits. SIP has, at its core, impression management. Communication scholars define impression management as either a strategic or unconscious effort to influence another's perception. Much of the earlier research on impression management focused on FtF communication and the nuances with meeting someone. A person's self-image was viewed as important in relational development. Later applications of impression management were undertaken once online communication began.

Selective self-presentation is not as likely to occur in FtF communication as in CMC due to the ability to observe all the obvious traits in person. Walther notes that "selective self-presentation is a process that is probably very much involved in how people put together the profile." This is due to the fact the in CMC, people want to be found as attractive, so they present the best image of themselves. Whereas in FtF communication, undesirable traits can be more readily detected. The receivers may idealize the senders based on making attributions from available paralingual cues found in the message. This process is enhanced with asynchronous exchanges, letting both sender and receiver have ample time to consider the messages sent and received. In the absence of FtF contextual cues, the likelihood of over-attributing given information of the sender is increased, often creating an idealized image of the message sender. For example, over-attribution is also found in online dating. While reading a perspective date's profile, the reader is likely to see themselves as similar to one another and therefore become more interested than they originally would have been. Finally, the feedback process addresses the reciprocal influence of the senders and the receivers. They develop impressions and intimacy as a result of their interaction.

==== Four elements of hyperpersonal model ====
Hyperpersonal Model

The hyperpersonal perspective is more than saying that an online relationship is intimate. Walther examines hyperpersonal relationships as those that are more intimate than if partners were physically together. Walther, in a number of different scholarly venues, articulated its complexity and other scholars elucidate the four components he studied: senders; receivers; channel; and feedback. These four also constitute many of the models of communication.

- Sender: Selective Self-Presentation

According to Walther, senders have the ability to present themselves in highly strategic and highly positive ways. This self-presentation is controlled and it serves as a foundation for how CMC users get to know one another. The fundamental underpinning of this component of the hyperpersonal perspective is affinity seeking. That is, senders provide information online that prompts affinity in others. Because, according to Griffin et al., senders are able to communicate their most desirable and attractive traits, accomplishments, and actions "without fear of contradiction from their physical appearance, their inconsistent actions, or the objections of third parties who know their dark side."

- Receiver: Idealization of the Sender

At the core of this component in the hyperpersonal perspective is attribution. Attributions are those evaluations and judgements we make based on the actions or behaviors of others. The receiver tends to attribute and, according to the theory, may "overattribute", which means that the receiver is likely to think that a sender has more similarities than differences. With this, viewers of online dating profiles can over attribute the information presented on the profile, thus causing an "idealized image" of the owner. Further, a receiver may experience an over reliance on the minimal cues available online and forget that the relationship he or she has with a sender is based on words.

- Channel Management

The asynchronous nature of CMC allows online participants to think about texts or emails before sending them. Further, prior to sending messages, one can rewrite them for clarity, sense, and relevance. Online asynchronous experiences allow for "optimal and desirable" communication, ensuring that the messages are of high quality. Walther contends that the more relational the affection or more desirable the other communicator is, the more editing in message composition.

- Feedback

Walther interprets feedback as behavioral confirmation, which is a "reciprocal influence that partners exert". In communication theory, this is referred to as self-fulfilling prophecy. This prophecy essentially is a tendency for an individual's expectation of a target person to evoke a response from that person which, in turn, reaffirms the original prediction. Walther's hyperpersonal perspective acknowledges a feedback system this way: "When a receiver gets a selectively self-presented message and idealizes its source, that individual may respond in a way that reciprocates and reinforces the partially modified personae, reproducing, enhancing, and potentially exaggerating them". Because cues in an online environment are limited, the feedback that does occur is often exaggerated or magnified.

The four components – sender, receiver, channel, and feedback – suggest that the hyperpersonal perspective is a process which is ongoing and dynamic. Walther concludes that SIP is a "process" theory because both information and interpersonal meaning is accumulated over time, providing online partners an opportunity to establish a relationship.

==== Experiments ====
Two experiments were carried out by Walther and his colleagues from 1992 to 1994, focusing on channel management of computer-mediated communication. They are summarized below.

Around the time in 1992 when Walther produced and published his Social Information Processing theory, he and his colleagues conducted an experiment, examining the effects of time and communication channel – asynchronous computer conferencing versus face-to-face meetings – on relational communication in groups. Prior research on the relational aspects of computer-mediated communication has suggested strong depersonalizing effects of the medium due to the absence of nonverbal cues. Past research is criticized for failing to incorporate temporal and developmental perspectives on information processing and relational development. In this study, data were collected from 96 subjects assigned to computer conferencing or face-to-face zero-history groups of 3, who completed three tasks over several weeks' time. Results showed that computer-mediated groups increased in several relational dimensions to more positive levels and that these subsequent levels approximated those of face-to-face groups. Boundaries on the predominant theories of computer-mediated communication are recommended, and principles from uncertainty reduction and social penetration are discussed.

Later, Walther and his colleagues did follow-up research. Previous research on the interpersonal tone of computer-mediated communication shows different effects using longitudinal computer-mediated groups than are found in research using one-shot groups, even before the developmental aspects associated with time can accrue. One factor distinguishing these approaches is the anticipation of future interaction experienced by longitudinal groups. This research reports an experiment assessing the relative effects of anticipated future interaction and different communication media (computer-mediated versus face-to-face communication) on the communication of relational intimacy and composure. Asynchronous and synchronous computer conferencing and face-to-face groups were examined. Results show that the assignment of long-term versus short-term partnerships has a larger impact on anticipated future interaction reported by computer-mediated than face-to-face partners. Evidence also shows that anticipation is a more potent predictor of several relational communication dimensions than communication condition. Implications for theory and practice are identified.

==== Evaluation of SIP: Intimacy ====
Several theorists have explored the differences in intimacy developed through CMC versus face-to-face communication. Walther is convinced that the length of time that CMC users have to send their messages is the key factor that determines whether their messages can achieve the same level of intimacy that others develop face-to-face. Over an extended period, the issue is not the amount of social information that can be conveyed online; rather, it is the rate at which the information builds up. Any message spoken in person will take at least four times longer to communicate through CMC. When comparing 10 minutes of face-to-face conversation with 40 minutes of CMC, there was no difference in partner affinity between the two modes. Anticipated future interaction is a way of extending physiological time, which gives the likelihood of future interaction and motivates CMC users to develop a relationship. Relational messages provide interactants with information about the nature of the relationship, the interactants' status in the relationship, and the social context within which the interaction occurs.

The "shadow of the future" motivates people to encounter others on a more personal level. A chronemic cue is a type of nonverbal cue not filtered out of CMC and indicates how one perceives, uses, or responds to issues of time. Unlike tone of voice, interpersonal distance, or gestures, time is the one nonverbal cue that cannot be filtered out of CMC. For example, a person can send a text message at a certain time of the day and when a response is received he or she can gauge how much time elapsed between messages. Social information processing theory says that a prompt reply signals deference and liking in a new relationship or business context. A delayed response may indicate receptivity and more liking in an intimate relationship; partners who are comfortable with each other do not need to reply as quickly.

Meanwhile, Walther, with his colleagues, conducted another investigation which examined how computer-mediated communication (CMC) partners exchange personal information in initial interactions, focusing on the effects of communication channels on self-disclosure, question-asking, and uncertainty reduction. Unacquainted individuals (N = 158) met either face-to-face or via CMC. Computer-mediated interactants exhibited a greater proportion of more direct and intimate uncertainty reduction behaviors than unmediated participants did, and demonstrated significantly greater gains in attributional confidence over the course of the conversations. The use of direct strategies by mediated interactants resulted in judgments of greater conversational effectiveness by partners.

Others, such as Dr. Kevin B. Wright, examined the difference in developing and maintaining relationships both exclusively and primarily online. Specifically, Wright has found the effectiveness of "openness and positivity" in online communication versus avoidance in offline relationships.

=== Warranting ===
==== Origin ====
Walther and Parks noticed that people often meet offline after having first met online. Sometimes these experiences are positive, and other times negative. They are dissatisfied with existing theories' ability to explain these phenomena. To fill in the theoretical gap, Walther and Parks adopt the original concept of warranting presented by Stone, describing connections between one's self and self-presentation as a continuum rather than a binary, moderated by anonymity. They suggested that the potential for anonymity resulted in the potential for a discrepancy along this continuum. The greater this potential discrepancy, the more compelling it is for observers to be skeptical of information provided by the individual about the self. Warrants, as described by Walther and Parks, are perceived reliable cues that observers use to gauge how someone's true identity matches that which is presented online.

According to Walther, "Warranting pertains to the perceived legitimacy and validity of information about another person that one may receive or observe online." As also indicated by researchers DeAndrea and Carpenter, warranting value is the degree to which a target is perceived to have shaped information about him or herself to appear a certain way. Over the years, individuals have come to learn a lot about each other through online discussion groups or online role-playing games. Many have also started to gain an understanding of another person through "personal homepages and other forms of online interaction and self-presentation, including online dating sites." However, with the introduction of many online social media sites such as Facebook, Twitter, and LinkedIn, there are many opportunities for people to interact using CMC. As such, there are many factors – photographs, videos, and the ability to build your own profile – that set social media apart from the text-only CMC that Walther originally studied. For example, if a person describes him or herself as a quiet, reserved person but friends add pictures of him or her out at a bar with a large group of people, these two ideas will contradict each other. How the person processes this contradiction is the main idea of Walther's warranting theory.

"If the information we're reading has warranting value, then it gives us reason to believe it is true." This value is defined as the extent to which the cue is perceived to be unaltered by the target. Warrants that are very difficult to manipulate by the user are considered high in warranting value. They are more likely to be accepted as truth. An example of this is information added to your profile by others because the owner cannot easily change it (Others-generated warrants). Partial warranting is another example. It is information that, though provided by the user, contains easily verifiable facts. Numerical information, such as height, weight, age, or address constitutes as partial warranting, as these figures are easily checked and provide little room for gray area. Low warrant information is easily manipulated and therefore less believable. It is much more questionable in terms of accuracy (Walther & Parks, 2002). An example of this is information self-reported on personal profile pages. These can range from interests and hobbies, to other personal details (also known as constraining information, which is not easily verified but restricts identity).

==== Experiment ====
Walther, Van Der Heide, Kim, Westerman, and Tong (2008), wanted to explore if the attractiveness of friends, as well as what these friends said on an individual's profile, had an effect on social attraction. They investigated the topic by assigning random participants to view fake Facebook pages.

This experiment had two phases. In the first phase, researchers displayed two comments from friends of a profile with neutral content. The small profile pictures of commenting friends were either attractive or unattractive, and the comments suggested either socially desirable or socially undesirable behaviors. It was found that social attractiveness was positively correlated with the physical attractiveness of commenting friends (Walther et al., 2008). This indicates that the simple observable presence of others in one's social network may be enough to make social judgments. In the second phase, researchers tested the effects of self-generated information against information generated by others. Walther et al. (2009) compared subjects reactions to fake Facebook profiles and their judgments of extroversion and introversion. Profiles contained either self-generated information suggesting the profile owner was introverted or extroverted, and others-generated statements suggesting the owner was introverted or extroverted. Information suggesting introversion was considered negative while information suggestion extroversion was considered to be positive. Walther et al. (2009) found that while others-generated statements do indeed have an effect on observer judgments, the effect did not override self-generated information or negativity effects.

His experiments confirmed that people value high warrant information. It found that credibility levels and attractiveness were swayed by comments made on the profile by people other than its owner. It also confirmed his beliefs by comparing high and low warrant information and finding that friends' remarks were valued higher than the owner's claims in regards to physical attractiveness and outgoingness. These studies have found that, unlike with email, communication comes from both the owner and other users of social media and viewers do not give these two opinions equal value. This is identified in the fact that friends' comments often override the profile owner's claims when forming impressions of the profile owner.

=== Synchronous and asynchronous communication ===
Synchronous communication refers to interactions that occur in real-time, where participants in a conversation are actively communicating while online at the same time. Examples of online synchronous communication would be text messages and other instant messaging platforms, as well as internet telephony, such as FaceTime and Skype. Asynchronous communication, on the other hand, occurs when conversation participants are not online at the same time, and messages are left for the other to receive. Examples of online asynchronous communication include voicemails, emails, blogs, and social media sites.

A 2011 study in Finland suggested that it is synchronicity, not online social use in general, that separates generations in the Digital Age. Taipale concluded that synchronous modes (e.g. instant messaging and Internet calls) are clearly generation differentiated practices, comparing with asynchronous mode (e.g. social networking sites, blogs, online discussion forums). And they are more frequently used by the second digital generation than the first digital generation (1 DG) and digital immigrants (DI). Taipale then explained these results in terms of privacy and communicative efficacy. The synchronous online communication provide more privacy as well as an instant and abundant channel for effective communication, which are features especially appreciated by the youngest user generation.

Burgoon, Chen, and Twitchell (2010) also conducted an experiment to test how synchronicity affects online interactions. They had their participants conduct team-oriented tasks, and used different methods of communication to observe how people perceived their fellow team members. They proposed that synchronicity affects interactivity, and the results of the experiment supported their hypothesis. They observed that synchronous forms of communications allow for increased mental and behavioral engagement between parties, allowing participants to feel a stronger sense of connection, presence, identification, and social awareness in the conversation.

== Research and applications ==
Social information processing theory has been used to study online relationships in a variety of contexts. Since the late 1990s, the Internet has increased the amount of totally-mediated interactions making the possibility of developing and sustaining entire relationships online more possible.

=== Application in online dating ===
Some early studies looked at e-mail discussion groups while more contemporary research has placed a great deal of attention on social media networks such as Facebook and online dating sites. These situations are significant to observing SIP and the hyperpersonal perspective in action.

In relation to romantic relationships, several studies and subsequent theories have stemmed from SIP, combining it with theories such as Social Penetration Theory (SPT) or Relational Dialectics to further examine how modern day relationships are formed and sustained. Scholars Nicole Ellison, Rebecca Heino, and Jennifer Gibbs conducted such a study and formed their own theory in their article "Managing Impressions Online: Self-Presentation Processes in the Online Dating Environment" which utilized both SIP and SPT to examine the development of modern relationships from online acquaintances to intimate partners.

Scholars James Farrer and Jeff Gavin from Sophia University in Japan examined the online dating process and dating relationship development to test the SIP theory. This study examines the experiences of past and present members of a popular Japanese online dating site in order to explore whether social information processing theory is applicable to Japanese online dating interactions, and how and to what extent Japanese daters overcome the limitations of CMC through the use of contextual and other cues. 36 current members and 27 former members of Match.com Japan completed an online survey. Using issue-based procedures for grounded theory analysis, they found strong support for SIP. Japanese online daters adapt their efforts to present and acquire social information using the cues that the online dating platform provides, although many of these cues are specific to Japanese social context.

In 2011, scholar Daria Heinemann analyzed the effects of SIP in the 1998 movie You've Got Mail, and developed an activity to foster the teaching of SIP to students. Throughout the movie, the two main characters virtually meet in an online chat room, and end up falling in love throughout all of their communication, which leads them to adapt their communication style and presentation in real life. For this activity, Daria suggests watching two specific scenes, 2 and 21, which focus on the introduction of the online relationship between the two characters, and also demonstrate the hyperpersonal perspective of this theory. Daria asked students to compare and contrast these two scenes to see the implication and representation of SIP. Following the viewing of these two scenes, she suggests some debriefing questions to help further understand and analyze SIP in the context of this movie.

Besides online dating, SIP can also be related to detachment and extramarital attachment unconsciously, which is an area that Zackery A. Carter investigated. Carter claims that casual communications through Facebook have the potential to lead to a more emotional/sexual based relationship regardless of their current status. If people have a long tiring day and utilize Facebook to relax and unwind at the end of the day, they may present themselves in an entirely different way, along with being more open and invoking self-disclosure. Talking to someone online can be an entirely different feeling than talking to someone in person after a long day, which is what Carter was looking to demonstrate with this study.

=== Application in online marketing ===
In business contexts, social information processing has been used to study virtual teams as well as the ways viral marketers influence the adoption of products and services through the Internet.

Mani R. Subramani and Balaji Rajagopalan pay special attention to the SIP applied to real-world online marketing and promotion activities. The background which stimulate their academic interests is that online social networks are increasingly being recognized as an important source of information influencing the adoption and use of products and services. While the potential of viral marketing to efficiently reach out to a broad set of potential users is attracting considerable attention, the value of this approach is also being questioned. SIP theory provides a useful lens to examine the interpersonal influence processes that are the hallmark of viral marketing, since it views the social network as an important source of information and cues for behavior and action for individuals. Prior studies examining the diffusion of innovations and the transmission of ideas in social networks have viewed the interpersonal influence as occurring largely from face-to-face interactions. However, interpersonal influence in viral marketing occurs in computer-mediated settings and is significantly different from that occurring in conventional contexts in several ways.

There needs to be a greater understanding of the contexts in which this strategy works and the characteristics of products and services for which it is most effective. What is missing is an analysis of viral marketing that highlights systematic patterns in the nature of knowledge-sharing and persuasion by influencers and responses by recipients in online social networks. To this end, they propose an organizing framework for viral marketing that draws on prior theory and highlights different behavioral mechanisms underlying knowledge-sharing, influence, and compliance in online social networks.

=== Application in online education ===
SIP has also been used to study learning in entirely online classes examining the ways that students develop relationships with the instructor and with each other. Dip Nandi, Margaret Hamilton, and James Harland from RMIT University did research on asynchronous discussion forums in fully online courses. Their study focuses on the online discussion process between the students and the instructors, as both senders and receivers, through the CMC channel with the asynchronous nature.

Fully online courses are becoming progressively more popular because of their "anytime anywhere" learning flexibility. One of the ways students interact with each other and with the instructors within fully online learning environments is via asynchronous discussion forums. However, student engagement in online discussion forums does not always take place automatically and there is a lack of clarity about the ideal role of the instructors in them. In their research, Nandi and his colleges report on the quality of discussion in fully online courses through analysis of discussion forum communication. They conducted the research on two large fully online subjects for computing students over two consecutive semesters and used a grounded theoretic approach for data analysis. The results reveal what students and instructors consider as quality interaction in fully online courses. The researchers also propose two frameworks based on our findings that can be used to ensure effective online interaction.

Yonty Friesem discusses the use of SIP within the book Emotions, Technology and Behaviors, specifically in the chapter titled "Empathy for the Digital Age: Using Video Production to Enhance Social, Emotional, and Cognitive Skills". Throughout this chapter, Yonty discusses using filmmaking to assist in learning and teaching in an academic setting. He talks about the richness of the digital media that is present within SIP and how the medium that is used can help people to demonstrate their emotions, which can be amplified through the use of video production as it provides a completely different perspective and format.

=== Application in child development ===
In recent years, SIP has also been used to examine the development of aggressive behavior in children. Theories of aggressive behavior and ethological observations of animals and children suggest the existence of distinct forms of reactive (hostile) and proactive (instrumental) aggression. Toward the validation of this distinction, groups of reactive aggressive, proactive aggressive, and nonaggressive children were identified. Social information-processing patterns were assessed in these groups by presenting hypothetical vignettes to subjects.

The reason why some children develop aggressive behavior can be traced back to how these particular children deal with different social cues. Some children participate in something known as social withdrawal, meaning that they avoid involvement or are not involved in social or group activities. This is due to either rejection-aggression or rejection-withdrawal. In rejection-aggression, the child is rejected from a peer group due to their aggressive behavior. Rejection-withdrawal is when the child rejects the peer group and separates themselves from them.

In addition to rejection-aggression and rejection-withdrawal, children may experience rejection-sensitivity and feelings of victimization at young ages. When this occurs, they subconsciously develop defenses, or barriers, to protect themselves from future breaches. Accompanied by these barriers, however, is a greater susceptibility to lashing out in anger or experiencing intense episodes of anxiety. Children who experience rejection or victimization at an early age, may develop mental health deficiencies that can follow them into adulthood. Sensitivity to rejection, as well as victimization can be linked to SIP, as a child's ability to make decisions in social contexts can be greatly affected by these feelings.

Something else that can greatly affect child development is PCA (parent-child aggression), and this most often stems North America. Typically, this aggression occurs when a parent or guardian fails to respond appropriately to their child misbehaving or making a mistake. Those who receive this abuse are likely to become abusers themselves. Children who are abused may aim to take their frustration and troubled emotions out on other individuals, potentially perpetuating the cycle. SIP makes the claim that abusers use physicality to deal with mistakes from their children due to some preconceived notion that abuse works. If one's parents abused them when they messed up, they may operate under the implication that it worked on them, so it will work on their own children. It can also stem from a parental figure's inability to regulate their emotions, and they may lash out physically.

In adolescence, a person will spend far more time around their peers than they do with their own parents. In child development, peers are the biggest influence on the way people think, feel, and act in response to certain situations. Although peer influence can affect individuals even in adulthood, it is most often displayed in adolescence or one's earlier years. The variability in the behavior and personality of some of these peers can have an impact on one's ability to respond and process the influence of peers.

Kenneth A. Dodge and Nicki R. Crick from Vanderbilt University did a research on the social information bases of aggressive behavior in children. In their study, the ways that basic theories and findings in cognitive and social psychology (including attribution, decision-making, and information-processing theories) have been applied to the study of aggressive behavior problems in children are described. Following an overview of each of these theories, a social information-processing model of children's aggressive behavior is outlined. According to this model, a child's behavioral response to a problematic social stimulus is a function of five steps of processing: encoding of social cues, interpretation of social cues, response search, response evaluation, and enactment. Skillful processing at each step is hypothesized to lead to competent performance within a situation, whereas biased or deficient processing is hypothesized to lead to deviant social behavior. Empirical studies are described in which children's patterns of processing have been found to predict individual differences in their aggressive behavior. The implications of this body of work for empirically based interventions aimed at reducing children's aggressive behavior are discussed.

=== Application in leadership ===
SIP has become more prominent in today's society with the addition of using computers for online communication. This is also apparent in the area of leadership and remote work. Paul E. Madlock from Texas A&M International University has conducted a variety of researches in organizational communication, where he also implemented the ideas of Walther into some of his work. In his article titled "The Influence of Supervisors' Leadership Style on Telecommuters", he talks about the most effective style of leadership in today's Digital Age, which is focused on the use of technology. SIP can be related to the style and content of the message, as well as the timing that the message is presented, whether that be synchronously or asynchronously. In this study, Madlock got organizations that utilize remote workers to fill out a survey based on their job satisfaction and the satisfaction that they feel when leadership is communicated through a computer, whether that be something like Skype, Instant Messaging, cell phones, email and via voice. Employees were able to develop a better connection with their leadership team if it was task orientated and the information was presented in a realistic format that represented who they were, as opposed to a fake personality.

In addition to online communication, SIP is commonly displayed in physical workplaces, as show by LMXD (Leader member exchange differentiation), which is a relationship that can develop between leaders and subordinates based on a subordinate's overall contributions to a workplace. LMX (high quality leader member exchange) suggests that these relationships are formed when there is a sense of respect between leaders and subordinates, suggesting a lower power distance. Since workplaces can get quite busy, often times employers cannot form these kinds of relationships with every single employee, so it may seem that certain employees are favored over others. The differentiation in these relationships can have negative effects on the workplace. One of these negative effects is knowledge hiding, which is when an employee or employees deliberately hide information that could benefit others, and this is often done out of spite.

Zhang, Yong, and Hao conducted a study on knowledge hiding to understand how team climates can change under certain circumstances, particularly when a supervisor seems to prioritize a bottom-line mentality. Prioritizing a bottom-line mentality can make a workplace more competitive, as it can seem to the employees that their needs don't matter as much. The study ultimately found that a bottom-line mentality has a strong effect towards employee knowledge hiding.

Prioritization of a bottom-line mentality can lessen the need employees feel to share any ideas they come up with. Surveys have shown that a majority of new ideas, innovations, and solutions originate from the employees of an organization. Employee IB (innovative behavior) is a series of actions that details these new ideas and innovations, as well as their implementation. When leadership is poor however, it can downplay these innovative behaviors. SL (self-serving leadership) may often overlook these innovations in favor of their own wellbeing. Employees may not receive recognition they feel they deserve for their accomplishments if poor leadership seeks to prioritize themselves above all else. This is called psychological entitlement is when one believes they have failed to be recognized for their accomplishments, so if one is not receiving recognition, it may cause upset. In their study, Mao, Peng, Zhang, and Zhang found self-serving leadership has a very negative effect on employee innovations. When moral identity is lower, the relationship between SL and psychological entitlement is stronger. If the moral identity is higher, then vice versa.

Being a good entrepreneur includes valuing employees and their inputs, and resilience is especially important in successful entrepreneurship. For NVT (new venture team) members, entrepreneurs are a good source of critical information. Being an entrepreneur is loaded with uncertainties, and this can be frustrating to both the entrepreneur themselves, and to the NVT members. Performances will be negatively impacted and leave members unmotivated. If resilience persists amongst the team, then they can find optimism in moving forward. If lead entrepreneurs are resilient, then their teams will adopt that resilience.

Humble leadership is another enabler of a very healthy and productive work environment. It encourages employees to be innovative and productive but can also be shown to trigger time theft. Time theft refers to whenever an employee does anything that is not what they are supposed to be doing while they are on the clock. When it occurs, it is often used as a way to reclaim lost leisure time that employment may take away from. Shen, Wu, Xu, Wang, and Cai found in their study that there is a positive effect on humble leadership and employees engaging in time theft, but it can also be shown to create positive outcomes as well. When humble leaders are perceived as good representatives of an organization, it is found to affect innovative behavior.

Employees value work environments where making a mistake or failure doesn't result in an automatic termination. It can even foster great learning experiences. Leaders who prioritize profits and discourage failures, are missing the chance for their employees and themselves to create great learning experiences. A leader who makes failure unacceptable in any environment will foster a workplace where employees don't feel safe and easily expendable. Self-compassion is key when dealing with failures, from the employees' perspective of course, but compassion from a leader is always necessary. In their study, Shi, Gao, Yu, and Song found that bottom-line mentality can negatively affect learning from failures, whereas psychological availability is the opposite.

=== Application in social media ===
Social Media is a huge platform for SIP to happen, as a lot of people spend a lot of time talking to other individuals via social media. This is predominantly in a personal based setting, but it can be used in other settings as well such as journalism.

Blogs have great potential to display attributes of SIP, as it is purely a non-verbal way of communicating. Yanru Guo and Dion Hoe-Lian Goh conducted a content analysis on posting on microblogs in China, where individuals discussed having an STI, and more specifically having AIDS. They were attempting to display the transformation of messages over time and how intimate relationships were developed through the use of the blog. They compared over 1250 messages at the beginning of their time period to over 900 messages at the end of the time period, to see the difference between the depth of communication each user provided. They found that the level of details shared and intimacy between individuals increased between the two time periods, demonstrating the SIP and how it can be utilized to develop a relationship.

Rosie Mi Jahng and Jeremy Littau conducted an experiment on how people gather their information from journalists on social media, specifically related to Twitter. Some of the information that they discussed was the responsiveness of a journalist on their Twitter page, and the information that they provided on their bio page, as that can instantly give a sense of connectedness and reputability. Their study involved around 150 participants looking at a variety of fake Twitter accounts representing journalists who provided different levels of information and news within their tweets. They found out that the more a journalist posted and also responded to people's tweets, the more trust and reputation they built up, increasing the level of connection and relationship present.

SIP can also be applied to law enforcement and how they utilize social media strategically to present a good public image. Angela Coonce discusses a variety of different communication theories, including SIP, in her thesis on this topic. SIP provides the option for law enforcement to be able to develop a reputable and healthy relationship with the public in addition to the opinions and structure that they present in a non computer setting.

=== Applications to Covid-19 pandemic ===
The Covid-19 lockdown brought about a great feeling of distrust in regard to how the virus came to be. There was even distrust displayed toward the preventative social distancing measures that were mandated, or otherwise heavily encouraged throughout the duration of the pandemic. Preventative behavior is described behaviors, attitudes, and emotions that are used as a means to cope with prevention. Preventative behavior can spawn from many things, but the main causes are things such as conspiracy theories, education, culture, trust in higher ups, etc. Conspiracy theories in particular were quite common around this time, and these in particular can be quite detrimental. They can lead to distrust in government or higher ups, which leads to failure to follow policies and preventative measures. When distrust is high, leaders need to find ways to alleviate this. Nawaz, Soomro, Batool, Rani, and Aslam found that the relationship between preventative actions and conspiracy theories are lower a leader's behavioral integrity is high.

== Academic integration ==
While the theory revolves around the basis of interpersonal interaction from a socio-psychological perspective, communication scholars and academics use a positivistic (or empirical) approach to knowing in their study of SIP theory, meaning they rely heavily on numbers and data sets when striving to reach conclusions.

== Criticisms ==
Despite the fact that social information processing theory offers a more optimistic perspective through which to perceive of and analyze online interactions, the theory is not without its criticisms. Even though Walther proposed that users of computer-mediated communication (CMC) have the same interpersonal needs met as those communicating face-to-face (FtF), he proposed that the lack of visual cues inherent in CMC are disadvantages to be overcome over time. Thus, more time is needed for interactants to get to know one another, although he maintains that the same intimacy can be reached, just over a longer amount of time. In their research on social cues and impression formation in CMC, Martin Tanis and Tom Postmes found that when initial impressions in CMC are negative, it is questionable and not guaranteed that people will pursue future interaction which negates the idea that more personal and positive relationships will develop over time in CMC relationships.

Many of Walther's initial hypotheses relied on the assumption that positive social behaviors would be greater in face-to-face interactions than those in CMC. In a 1995 study, Walther used this hypothesis but added that any initial differences in socialness between the two media would disappear in time. Walther was surprised to find that his results turned out to be contrary to this prediction. The results showed that, regardless of time-scale, CMC groups were rated higher in most measures of relational communication than those participating in the FtF condition.

Robert Tokunaga has presented a cultural value flaw in the SIP theory. An additional support for this claim is that there is research on intercultural communication that suggests the amount of exchange of self-disclosures in CMC is shaped by cultural values. Also, Tokunaga's study found that individualistic cultural values were able to fit inside the SIP theory while collectivist cultural values did not.

Some originally argued that the scope of SIP Theory was too broad, since the realm of CMC is so expansive. However, the theory has evolved and been refined over years of research, and has developed more specificity within the discussions of online relationships, such as the topics of warranting and hyperpersonal perspectives.

Another area of SIP that has received some criticism relates to its testability. Walther has been a self-reflective critic of his own theory. First, Walther acknowledges that SIP has not fully acknowledged nor clarified the role of the issue of time in CMC relationships. Second, in discussing the hyperpersonal perspective, Walther admits that not all of the theoretical components of his hyperpersonal approach have been researched sufficiently. Third, in examining the warranting hypothesis, Walther, Brandon Van Der Heide, Lauren Hamel, & Hillary Shulman accept the fact that high warranting value may exist on those matters that have strong social desirability. For example, physical attractiveness is a highly desirable trait in the United States, making it socially desirable. So, as Walther accepts, online communicators would seek corroboration for those qualities that society deems important or desirable. Whether or not other less socially desirable qualities are prone to warranting overtures is not fully explained.

To summarize, social information processing theory arrived in the communication discipline at the time that the rest of the research world was starting to examine the Internet for its possible influence on interpersonal communication and human relationships. Thus, Joseph Walther is somewhat of a scholarly prophet, forecasting the importance of looking at online relationships in the early 1990s. Although a few criticisms emerge in SIP, people cannot ignore the fact that Walther's theory remains a pivotal framework to consider as we envision future relationship development in an uncertain technological time.

== New technologies ==
The label 'social media' has been attached to a quickly growing number of Web sites whose content is primarily user-driven. These communities are large-scale examples of SIP. Navigating the 'social' world of information online is largely a product of interpersonal connections online, and has prompted the creation of aggregating, or collaborative sources, to help assist collective groups of people sort through information. Learning about others through the concept of "seamless sharing" opens another world for SIP. Some computer tools that facilitate this process are:

- Authoring tools: e.g. blogs
- Collaboration tools: e.g. Wikipedia
- Social networking: Facebook; Twitter; Instagram; SnapChat
- Collaborative filtering: Reddit; the Amazon Products Recommendation System; Yahoo Answer!

The process of learning from and connecting with others has not changed, but is instead manifested on the Internet. There are many different opinions regarding the value of social media interactions. These resources allow for people to connect and develop relationships using methods alternative to the traditional FtF-exclusive past, thus making CMC more prevalent amongst social media users.

== See also ==
- Nonverbal communication
- Source credibility
- Uses and gratifications theory
