= Social identity model of deindividuation effects =

Communication theory

The social identity model of deindividuation effects (or SIDE model) is a theory developed in social psychology and communication studies. SIDE explains the effects of anonymity and identifiability on group behavior. It has become one of several theories of technology that describe social effects of computer-mediated communication.

The SIDE model provides an alternative explanation for effects of anonymity and other "deindividuating" factors that classic deindividuation theory cannot adequately explain. The model suggests that anonymity changes the relative salience of personal vs. social identity, and thereby can have a profound effect on group behavior.

With the advance of technology, it is becoming increasingly researched how having the control of being incognito on the web and having profiles that represent one's person is affecting relationships and communication in our lives. The model of deindividuation is described by scholarly articles as "the situation in which individuals act in groups and do not see themselves as individuals, thereby facilitating antinormative behavior". Furthermore, research on the SIDE model investigates prosocial behavior, prevention of social disturbance, and prevention of child prejudice. It is said that conformity to group norms is a large part of deindividuation when understanding social identity within it. Other studies suggest that the identification of self through online groups lessens ones actual idea of personal identity outside of online spaces; concluding that even when personal identity is seemingly salient in online spaces it still further disassociates the person with themselves outside of online communities.

== Background ==
SIDE developed as a critique of deindividuation theory. Deindividuation theory was developed to explain the phenomenon that in crowds, people become capable of acts that rational individuals would not normally endorse (see also Crowd psychology). In the crowd, so it would seem, humans become disinhibited and behave anti-normatively. Early versions of deindividuation theory saw this as a consequence of reduced self-awareness and accountability. Diener and others later focused more exclusively on loss of self as the core psychological process underlying deindividuation.

Reicher criticized deindividuation theory for several reasons. Among others, historical evidence and case studies strongly suggested that the psychological process proposed by deindividuation theory (a loss of self) did not occur in the crowd. A meta-analysis of empirical deindividuation research confirmed there was no consistent empirical evidence for the processes it proposed. To the contrary: anonymity and reduced self-awareness enhanced sensitivity to local norms. SIDE researchers concluded that there is no good empirical support for the process of deindividuation, and factors that should produce deindividuation have highly variable effects on behavior. To account for this, SIDE proposes that there are no blanket indiscriminate effects of anonymity, but that anonymity effects are influenced by, and can only be understood through, their interaction with the social context.

Reicher also challenged the conceptualization of deindividuation as a loss of self. This process assumes that individuals have a unitary self-concept that they can be more or less aware of. Reicher and others argued that individuals do not have a unitary sense of self. Social identity theory, for instance, points out that one's sense of self is made up of personal identity and multiple social identities, all of which combine to shape one's personality. Social identities are likely to become the basis for self-definition when that social identity is salient, such as when making comparisons between "them" and "us". One consequence of salience is "depersonalization". In social identity research, the term depersonalization refers to a switch to a group level of self-categorization in which self and others are seen in terms of their group identities. (Note: in research on social identity, depersonalization is not the same as deindividuation or a loss of self.)

According to self-categorization theory, depersonalization makes perceptions of the outgroup more stereotypical. Self-perceptions also shift: self and other ingroup members become interchangeable, and the individual self-stereotypes in terms of group attributes. Depersonalization thus transforms individuals into group members who regulate their behavior according to ingroup norms. Importantly, and in contrast to deindividuation, the psychological state of depersonalization does not imply a loss of rationality or behavioural disinhibition; rather, the individual behaves rationally and regulates behaviour according to ingroup standards. These ideas from social identity theory and self-categorization theory provided key ingredients for Reicher's critique of deindividuation theory, and are also the foundations upon which SIDE was modelled.

Deindividuation is basically when one person does not think of themselves as an individual being, but rather as a group or more than one being.

This does not necessarily mean bad or inappropriate behavior. This means that the group norms are changed.

There has been recent studies on the SIDE model may put an end to racism in growing children, as well as social awkwardness. With fresh minds and our growing world of technology, the SIDE model is becoming a more researched topic.

The SIDE model tells us that people change their behavior when introduced into groups. For example, when a person engages in an activity, such as a party or social event, they change their behavior. They become less individualized and unique, and merge themselves with the surrounding people to become almost one person. They can act and do things as a group.

== Development ==
The model was first named by Lea and Spears and later developed in a series of publications. The SIDE model took Reicher's ideas about the crowd, and applied and extended them to computer-mediated communication. Early research in this domain suggested that, similarly to deindividuation theory, users of online computers were prone to flaming and other disinhibitions due to a reduction in social cues. The SIDE model was developed, in first instance, to account for contradictory effects of social cues in online groups. SIDE thus assumed that effects in the crowd and in online environments showed some similar properties.

The first comprehensive statement of SIDE was by Reicher, Spears, and Postmes. According to SIDE, a social identity approach can account for many of the effects observed in deindividuation research and in crowd psychology, as well as in computer-mediated communication. For example, deindividuation has been found to foster group identification and to induce greater opinion polarization in small groups communicating online. In order to understand effects of factors such as anonymity and reduced cues on group behavior, one needs to take the social and inter-group context into account. SIDE argues that anonymity and social context in interaction have cognitive and strategic consequences.

== Cognitive SIDE ==
Group immersion and anonymity have cognitive consequences that affect the relative salience of personal and social identities. These factors do not produce a loss of self as proposed by deindividuation theory. Rather, anonymity and immersion in the group can enhance the salience of social identity and thereby depersonalize social perceptions of others and the self. SIDE argues this occurs principally because (visual) anonymity obscures individual features and interpersonal differences. As a result of the decreased visibility of the individual within anonymous groups, the process of depersonalization is accentuated, and cognitive efforts to perceive the group as an entity are amplified. Provided that there is some basis to perceive self and others as members of one group, anonymity therefore enhances the salience of the shared social identity. The net result is that people will tend to perceive self and others in terms of stereotypic group features, and are influenced accordingly.

Anonymity does not automatically or mechanically influence the salience of social identities. An individual can be identified in such a way that it promotes a more individuated person-perception, or, alternatively, that it promotes a stronger social categorization. In some instances, making the individual more identifiable may strengthen social categorization. This may happen particularly in contexts within which these social categories are potentially meaningful and therefore accessible, and when group memberships are visually clearly identifiable (as is the case for gender, certain racial characteristics, disabilities, etc.).

SIDE thus describes the cognitive process by which the salience of social identity is affected by the absence or presence of individuating information. This process can only operate to the extent that some sense of groupness exists from the outset. If individuals interact anonymously in the absence of any specific social identity or group boundaries, anonymity would have the reverse effect of accentuating one’s isolation from the group or by further obscuring group boundaries. Juxtaposing the two possibilities, anonymity in the group either has the effect of amplifying a shared social identity that, however rudimentary, is already in place, or it can amplify the individual independence which exists in contexts in which no shared identity is available. The latter process, whereby anonymity provides the opportunities for people to express and develop identities independent of the social influence of the group, is further elaborated in the Strategic SIDE.

== Strategic SIDE ==
Anonymity also has strategic consequences: it affects the ability to express personal and social identities. Strategic concerns come into play when an out-group has more power than the ingroup, and where the norms of both groups are at odds with each other. In such cases, the identifiability of ingroup members towards the outgroup will shift the power balance between groups: identifiability towards a more powerful outgroup limits the degree to which the ingroup's identity can be expressed freely and without sanction on those dimensions where ingroup norms conflict with out-group standards and values, and which are punishable or otherwise sanctionable. Conversely, anonymity towards a more powerful outgroup may be a convenient instrument for the ingroup to express itself on those same dimensions.

The strategic SIDE thus proposes that anonymity may be "used" by less powerful groups to express aspects of their identity. This may appear to be similar to the effects that anonymity has for accountability in classic deindividuation theory. However, unlike deindividuation theory, SIDE takes account of the inter-group context within which identifiability and anonymity occur. By implication, a loss of accountability does not result in the disinhibited or random anti-normative behaviour of individuals that deindividuation theory is concerned with. Rather, according to SIDE, anonymity affects the ability for a group to express its identity, and thus to engage in targeted and ingroup normative behaviour, thereby changing power relations between groups. The close connection between identity expression and power proposed by SIDE may explain the patterned and targeted behaviour of crowds whose violent actions (if they occur) are very often symbolic, not random.

In addition to anonymity between groups, SIDE also considers strategic effects of anonymity within groups. Here, SIDE has particularly explored the consequences of anonymity (as well as isolation) from other ingroup members: On the one hand this deprives individual group members of social support from their fellows, and this may hinder their ability to express their ingroup identity in the face of a powerful and unsympathetic outgroup. On the other hand, the knowledge that other ingroup members are unable to identify the self may have consequences for (in particular) low identifiers to feel less committed to ingroup norms.

== Group Cohesion and Solidarity ==
Through deindividuation, the focus on individual differences decreases, which can encourage unity and togetherness within a group. When individuals become less self-aware, they tend to adopt the collective identity of the group. By sharing an identity, members of the group feel a sense of belonging and feel more encouraged to cooperate and exhibit prosocial behaviour. This is supported by research that has explored the effects of online group identity. This study found internet use to be linked with increased social support as a result of group solidarity. Furthermore, other studies have found a different relationship between deindividuation and group identity. Lee (2006) found that the more deindividuated an internet user is, the more strongly they identify with their online group. Group identity is an important factor in the development of solidarity within a group. This is because effects of group solidarity are most significant when the group is focused on a common cause. For example, participants of online activist movements such as 'Black Lives Matter' all share a purpose and therefore a sense of unity.

== Applications ==
Today, SIDE is used to explain the effects of anonymity and social isolation in various contexts. Research on SIDE has particularly focused on crowds and collective action, on online teams, electronic relationships and virtual communities, knowledge sharing, and more recently on social effects of surveillance (e.g., by means of CCTV or electronic tagging).

== See also ==
- Cues-filtered-out theory
- Emotions in virtual communication
- Hyperpersonal model
- Social identity theory
- Social information processing theory
- Theories of technology
- Deindividuation
