= Hyperpersonal model =

Model of interpersonal communication

The hyperpersonal model is a model explains how online communication can sometimes create stronger connection than face to face conversation because people can carefully choose how they present themselves to others. The hyperpersonal model demonstrates how individuals communicate uniquely, while representing themselves to others, how others interpret them, and how the interactions create a reciprocal spiral of FtF communication. Compared to ordinary FtF situations, a hyperpersonal message sender has a greater ability to strategically develop and edit self-presentation, enabling a selective and optimized presentation of one's self to others.

Communication professor Joseph Walther is credited with the development of this theory in 1996, synthesizing his and others' extensive research on computer-mediated communication.

== Conditions and key components ==
=== Conditions ===
The hyperpersonal model addresses three questions: 1) when is mediated interaction impersonal; 2) when is CMC interpersonal; and 3) when is CMC hyperpersonal? Hyperpersonal communication, according to Walther, is "more socially desirable than we tend to experience in parallel FtF interaction" (p. 17). Combinations of media attributes, social phenomena, and social-psychological processes may lead CMC to become "hyperpersonal", that is, to exceed face-to-face (FtF) communication. This perspective suggests that CMC users may experience greater levels of intimacy, unity and liking within a group or dyad than similar groups or dyads interacting FtF.

=== Key components ===
Hyperpersonal model

==== Senders ====
This component refers to "selective self-presentation". In CMC, message senders have a greater opportunity to optimize their self-presentation. Walther argues, "[CMC participants] were better able to plan, and had increased opportunity to self-censor. With more time for message construction and less stress of ongoing interaction, users may have taken the opportunity to objective self-awareness, reflection, selection and transmission of preferable cues." Message senders use the process of selective self-presentation, which refers to CMC users' ability to manage their online image. Being able to self-censor and manipulate messages is possible to do within a CMC context to a greater extent than in FtF interactions, so individuals have greater control over what cues are sent. Walther point out that asynchronous messages and reduced communication cues contribute to selective self-presentation. In CMC, communicators may inflate attributions about their communication partners. When communication partners are geographically dispersed, individuals are likely to make positive attributions if group salience is high. As a result, members are more likely to make attributions of similarity that lead to greater liking for partners. Paralinguistic cues are used as part of assessing communication partners when using CMC. Selective self-presentation provides an avenue for people to manage their image in a manner that FtF interaction does not. Reduced communication cues and potentially asynchronous communication are both common in CMC.

Reduced Cues: CMC reduces cues present in normal FtF interactions. In CMC, first impressions aren't based on physical, and instead rely on information and personality. Senders impressions are more malleable than in an in-person interaction.

Walthers cites a study by Chilcoat and DeWine (1985) in which three interpersonal perceptions were examined (attractiveness, attitude similarity, and credibility) against three asynchronous communication vehicles (FtF, videoconferencing, and audioconferencing). One would expect FtF to produce higher ratings for the interpersonal characteristics, but the opposite was true: audioconferencing partners produced higher ratings of their partners' attractiveness, attitude similarity, and credibility than in videoconference or FtF interaction.

==== Receivers ====
This component refers to "idealization". Walther argues that receivers have an "idealized perception" of the message sender in CMC. He says that the social identity model of deindividuation effects (SIDE) predicts that subtle context cues take on a strong value in CMC. The absence of FtF cues leads to the fact that receivers may be very sensitive to any subtle social or personality cues that occur in CMC communication this way, CMC partners build impressions of one another on minimal cues. With fewer cues on which to base their perceptions, receivers have to "fill in the gaps" of their understanding of the other interactant and often assume more positive characteristics of them. In other words, without FtF cues to mediate the interaction, participants may assume their partner is a "better person" than they actually are.

==== Asynchronous channel ====
Since CMC doesn't require copresence the way FtF communication does, members can take part in activities at their own convenience, taking advantaged of disentrained communication channels. Walther cites a relaxation of time constraints in CMC, often allowing for an asynchronous mode of communication. For example, with group communication, "...Making temporal commitments becomes discretionary. Group members may attend to the group process independently in time. When partners may attend their groups at their convenience, limitations on the amount of partners' mutual time available for meetings are less problematic."

Disentrained channels—most often asynchronous communication, via email or forums—gives individuals a way to manage their relationships within groups more efficiently than via FtF. Using asynchronous communication, such as email, individuals are able to manage group relationships in a way that maximizes time spent on group tasks. Through the process of entrainment, people synchronize their activities to meet the requirements of the group's needs, which is constrained by each individuals time and attention. Entrainment can make it difficult for groups to complete tasks together since it requires FtF, and thus synchronous, communication, which may include off-topic discussions that hinder productivity. Asynchronous communication may mitigate entrainment associated with group interaction. According to Walther, asynchronous group interaction may not be constrained by time and/or competing commitments. Group members using asynchronous communication can devote their full attention to the group when they have the opportunity. Greater attention can be spent focusing on tasks related to the group rather than spending time and effort on communication that is irrelevant to the goal.

According to Walther, CMC removes temporal limitations, thereby freeing time constraints. "Both task-oriented and socially oriented exchanges may take place without one constraining the time available for the other.

==== Feedback processes ====
Walther argues that the behavioral confirmation - "reciprocal influence that partners exert" in sender-receiver roles — is magnified in minimal-cue interaction like CMC. In other words, in CMC communication, we behave based on the expectation of the other and the social data occurring in communication process is selectively sent and perceived by communicators. Feedback between sender and receiver is a critical part of the communication interaction for relationship development in either FtF or CMC relationships. However, feedback in a minimal-cue environment may be magnified. Behavioral confirmation is the process of communication partners developing impressions and intimacy as a result of interaction. In CMC, behavioral confirmation along with magnification can become idealized, leading CMC partners to develop greater affinity for CMC partners than he or she might develop in a FtF context. This kind of CMC interaction fosters the development of an intensification loop, explaining the hyperpersonal relationships that develop in a cues-limited environment.

As the last component of hyperpersonal model, it is conceptualized as reciprocal interaction with others that strengthens one's online performance by bringing together the identity transforming potentials embedded within the other theoretical components.

== Foundations of the model ==
=== FtF vs. CMC ===
In face-to-face communication, physical features such as appearance, facial expressions, gesture and postures is exposed to others, which can help to convey nonverbal information to help with the communication. Face-to-face communication is formed naturally in emotional, cognitive and physical aspects. Those nonverbal languages are the cues that lack in CMC communication.

Some argue that the lack of nonverbal cues in CMC may decrease one's capability of fostering and managing accurate impression on others. Additionally, the lack of nonverbal cues leads to the fact that CMC communication involves less emotional elements than FtF communication does, which contributes to less richness and interpersonal and expressive cues that may provide more positive impression.

While other holds the opposite opinions. Walther suggested in his research in 1996 that CMC can actually improve the interpersonal bond between senders and receivers because of the lack of nonverbal cues and demographic messages. Walther argued that nonverbal and demographic cues that occur in FtF communication play a distracting role; while in CMC communication, hyperpersonal interaction is created in which senders pay more attention on the strategy of delivering message so that the self-presentation is enhanced and optimized, which eventually improve the interpersonal interaction.

=== Social information processing (SIP) ===
Walther developed an alternate approach to the cues-filtered-out approach. From the social information-processing (SIP) viewpoint, Walther states that people naturally want to develop social relationships. With SIP, the idea of the rate at which social information is exchanged is introduced. Additionally, SIP looks at verbal strategies used in mediated communication. Individuals strategically use language to convey a myriad of information about the sender, enabling the receiver to make attributes about the sender. Yet if CMC really was impersonal, why were so many people adopting CMC for social purposes, such as online gaming, bulletin boards and online chat groups? Walther advanced a different model to explain the growing trend toward the use of CMC for social interaction. When media attributes, social phenomena and social-psychological processes are integrated, the result is what Walther called "hyperpersonal."

== Development of the model ==
=== Three phases of CMC: impersonal, interpersonal, hyperpersonal ===
According to Walther's research (1996), the study of CMC went through three phases: from impersonal, to interpersonal, and finally to hyperpersonal. First, because CMC reduces nonverbal communication cues, some argued that CMC was more task-oriented than was FtF. The reasons are:

1. The concentration on the content of communication will not be distracted by social or emotional influences, so that CMC can "promote rationality by providing essential discipline."
2. CMC is also advantageous in group decision making since it avoids the influence of pressure of peers and status.
3. CMC can facilitate the efficiency of group work since it saves time when irrelevant interpersonal influence decreases.
4. Group members can enjoy more "democratic" atmosphere in CMC than that in FtF communication. In addition, anonymity, which can result in more freedom for members to verbalize without feeling pressure from high-status members, is one of the most important features of CMC.

Early CMC group research suggested that CMC groups were better for task-oriented interactions than their FtF counterparts. In task-oriented situations, where overly personal interpersonal interaction is not desired, then impersonal interaction is the appropriate kind of interaction, because the communication exchanges are more focused on the group's task. For example, a geographically dispersed technology team tasked with solving a software application bug may be more productive when the communication is task focused rather than interpersonal in nature. This doesn't mean that all CMC is impersonal, but points out that specific contexts may be better suited for impersonal interaction rather than personal exchanges.

Then, Walther stated that CMC is not always impersonal; instead, it can also develop social relationships. Although there is less social information exchange in CMC because of the absence of nonverbal cues, as the communication time increases, the exchange of social information is increasing accordingly. And the anticipation of future communication may make communicators to look for more information about the other. This mechanism leads to similar immediacy, similarity, composure, and receptivity as in FtF communication. However, there is a shortcoming. Since it takes time for CMC to achieve consensus, if the time for CMC is limited, the information exchanged will be much less than do FtF, which may impact the efficiency of group work.

Finally, Walther brought up the concept of hyperpersonal communication, which demonstrates that "CMC that is more socially desirable than we tend to experience in parallel FtF interaction." Walther proposes that CMC users do take part in hyperpersonal communication. Senders and receivers engage in the process of selective-self presentation through the message they create and send. This can lead to the idealization of the sender by the receiver based on making attributions from available paralingual cues found in the message. This process is enhanced with asynchronous exchanges, letting both sender and receiver have ample time to consider the messages sent and received. Hyperpersonal interaction would be excessively or above normal personal interaction. In other words, online relationships can develop into hyperpersonal that is excessively personal. When users experience commonality and are self-aware, physically separated, and communicating via a limited-cues channel, they can selectively self-present and edit their communication, enabling them to construct and reciprocate representations of their partners and relations without the interference of environmental reality. Hyperpersonal communication can thus be defined as computer-mediated interaction that is more attractive than experiences in similar FtF exchanges. The hyperpersonal model can be understood by looking at the established communication processes that include sender, receiver, channel, and feedback. The sender uses the process of selective self-presentation; this refers to CMC users' ability to manage their online image. Being able to self-censor and manipulate messages is possible to do within a CMC context to a greater extent than in FtF interactions, so individuals have greater control over what cues are sent.

He made this argument in four aspects of the communication process: receivers, senders, characteristics of the channel, and feedback processes.

=== Relationship between hyperpersonal model and CMC ===
There are results showing that under CMC, relational intimacy increased faster than FtF. One of the logics behind this finding is that hyperpersonal model is determining the inflated nature of feedback in CMC. Online communication behaviors have the possibility to exaggerate the influence on self-expression or self-presentations and following internalization. The theoretical assumption of the inflated interpersonal feedback in CMC pointed out in the hyperpersonal model by Walther is advanced by this research. Hyperpersonal model can be deemed as the theoretical framework for the research on exaggerated social process in CMC mainly from the following perspectives: 1)selective presentation, 2)Impression management, 3)Impression management in CMC, 4) idealized interpretation, 5)interpersonal feedback loop, 6)Identity shift, and 7) influence of feedback on identity shift.

== Examples and application ==
=== Relational intimacy comparison between CMC & FtF ===
- Hian, Chuan, Trevor and Detenber's 2006 study shows support for the hyperpersonal model. They found that relational intimacy increased at a faster rate in CMC than in FtF interactions.
- The hyperpersonal theory is also confirmed in a study of the disclosure-intimacy link in CMC vs FtF communication. Research proved that CMC "intensified the association between disclosure and intimacy relative to face-to-face interactions, and this intensification was fully mediated by increased interpersonal (relationship) attributions observed in the computer-mediated condition."
- Walther J.B. also explored in a study the effect of CMC on international collaborations and further affirmed the theory of hyperpersonal model. The results showed that relationships were fostered better in computer-mediated environments versus other mediations.
- Jiang, Bazarova, and Hancock use the hyperpersonal model to indicate the understandings of intimacy interpersonal relationships through CMC. In their study, the three researchers established "some online relationships tend to be more intimate than FtF relationships and CMC interactions are often rated as significantly more intimate than FtF counterparts. One approach to explain this phenomenon is the hyperpersonal model, which highlights the cognitive and behavioral processes and CMC affordances that can contribute to greater online intimacy". They depicted that people tend to "put their best foot forward" while engaging in CMC relationships. They found that CMC allows a person to self-present themselves. One thing they studied throughout this research was the context of online dating. Online dating allows a person to post a picture of themselves that they chose and avoid a less attractive photo of them. Jiang, Bazarova and Hancock discovered that "related to the sender's behavior in CMC, people appear to be more comfortable disclosing personal information in CMC than FtF". Jiang, et al. argue this may lead to a "more positive hyperpersonal relationship".

=== Online relationships ===
==== Online friendships ====
- In the article titled "'I've never clicked this much with anyone in my life': Trust and hyperpersonal communication in online friendships", Samantha Henderson and Michael Gilding (2004) explored the development of trust in hyperpersonal communication. They found that, in hyperpersonal communication, 1) online trust depends on the reputation of pseudonymous identities; 2) the online communication performance is essential in building up online trust; 3) hyperpersonal communication and online trust can be facilitated by pre-commitment; 4) situational factors in Western societies can help to promote the active trust in hyperpersonal communication.

==== Online romantic relationships ====
- Anderson and Emmers-Sommer used hyperpersonal theory to test their predictors of relationship satisfaction in online romantic relationships. Based on hyperpersonal theory, it's likely that users of CMC would feel more satisfaction in an online relationship since the communication is enhanced and there is a reduced number of cues on which to base the relationship.
- In another study titled "Predictors of relationship satisfaction in online romantic relationships" hyperpersonal model was affirmed by predicting a high rate of satisfaction in relationships fostered online.
- Another research of "modality switching" between online and offline dating elaborates the role of hyperpersonal model takes in providing clues of self-presentation and self-disclosure in online dating. In terms of the self-disclosure, in online dating which is hyperpersonal communication, there is a perceived anonymity which can accelerate the rate of self-disclosure. As for self-presentation, online daters portray idealized versions of selves.
- Hyperpersonal model is used by Gentile to examine relationship maintenance, satisfaction, and affectionate communication in romantic relationships, along with attachment theory. This research is different from the traditional ones but focusing on already-established relationships. Based on the background of university students increasingly use SNS(social network sites) in their romantic relationships maintenance, this research use hyperpersonal model and attachment theory to examine how they maintain their relationship satisfaction.

=== Application in social media ===
- In an article titled "The Implications of Heavy and Non-use of Social Media: An Auto-Ethnographic Approach", Adam Whiteside looked into the difference in attitudes and opinions between heavy and non-users of social media.

==== Facebook as an example ====
- Wang et al. 2010 affirms the "Hyperpersonal Model". More males & females showed a preference for attractive profile pictures when it came to initiating friendships. Thus non-verbal cues played an important role in this study. The emotions in virtual communication theory is also thus reaffirmed through this study as well.
- In their study "Mirror Mirror on my Facebook wall: Effects of exposure to Facebook on self esteem" authors Amy Gonzales & Jeffrey T. Hancock used the hyperpersonal model to study whether Facebook usage enhanced self-esteem or not. The results of this study showed that participants became self-aware once they were on their individual profile pages. Once participants edited their Facebook profile they reported high levels of self-esteem. These findings suggest that selective self representation in digital media leads to intensified relationship formation. Thus a high involvement on social media definitely enhances self-esteem.
- In a comprehensive study for exploring the social media such as Facebook, focusing on identity shift in CMC and other channels of the model.

=== Lies on the Internet ===
- In their book "Truth, Lies & Trust on the Internet" authors Monica Whilly and Adam Johnson also affirm the hyperpersonal model. They talk about the formation of hyperpersonal relationships being formed on the Internet due to extreme proximity and closeness. In this book they go one step further and talk about the issues of truth, lies and trust in these relationships. Several stories in the book talk about how the Internet's anonymity basically enables high levels of self disclosures in relationships which can in turn possibly lead to deception and flaming.
- In a study titled the "Perceptions of trustworthiness online : the role of visual and textual information by Catalina L. Toma looks at the role of textual information available in a profile versus the images on an individual's profile. The findings were that textual information generally elicited more trustworthiness among profile browsers and the addition of an image reduced it.
- In another study titled "The lies we tell and what it says about us: Using behavorial characteristics to explain Facebook activity" further breaks down online participants of communication into communicators (one to one) & broadcasters (one to many). They hyperpersonal model was affirmed in the communicators group who reported high group cohesion.
- In a research on "An Examination of Deceptive Self-Presentation in Online Dating Profiles", the relationship between online self-presentation, deception, and romantic relationships are examined using a novel cross-validation technique. It focuses on the separation between the self presented online and the embodied self, as the computer-mediated-communication creates chances of hyperpersonal communications of misrepresentation in the online dating profile among genders.

=== Application in medical treatment ===
- Jeanine Warisse Turner, Jean A. Grube, and Jennifer Meyers discussed in their work, titled 'Developing an optimal match within online communities: An exploration of CMC support communities and traditional support', the application of hyperpersonal model in the context of cancer treatment. They found that: 1) CMC can play a significantly important role for patients to seek support, which confirmed the hyperpersonal model in the context of patients' communication; 2) the experience of face-to-face communication with a partner will enhance the relationship of hyperpersonal communication; 3) a deep face-to-face relationship may lead to an indirect way of communication since partners are concerned with offending others even though they still want to offer support, while CMC communication is more able to focus on a specific goal.
- In 2003, James D. Robinson and Jeanine Turner published a research titled 'Impersonal, interpersonal, and hyperpersonal social support: Cancer and older adults'. This study focused on the social support and supportive communication of the old with cancer. They explore this fact from the optimal matching perspective brought up by Cutrona and Russell (1990), which demonstrate that "successful socially supportive interactions ... occur when the type of support desired by the individual is of the same type as the social support efforts of the provider." In this article, the authors cited several previous studies to confirm that hyperpersonal communication is helpful for the olds with cancer illness in seeking social support.

=== Application in group/community activities ===
- The hyperpersonal model posits that in the absences of cues available in FtF encounters, distributed partners form exaggerated impressions other group members. Pena, Walther and Hancock (2007) looked at perceptions of dominance in collocated virtual groups versus distributed groups. The results indicate that collocated groups perceived member dominance to be less extreme than in distributed groups. But there appeared to be no difference in the way collocated group members and distributed group member's perceived dominance. This supports the assertion that CMC environments intensify impression development, as suggested by the hyperpersonal models element of selective self-presentation.
- One study looking at perceived behaviors of assigned versus emergent leaders in CMC groups found that the "reification of behavioral stereotypes through hyperpersonal CMC allows emergent leaders to develop greater recognition" (p. 2). The question posed by these authors was under which conditions, having an assigned group leader or an unassigned group leader, would a leader emerge in a CMC context. They speculated that leaders emerge in CMC groups, as suggested by the hyperpersonal model, through the development of online behaviors. Wickham and Walther found that in CMC groups, there is greater consensus among group members about the group leader when the leader emerges from the group opposed to leaders being assigned to the group. Within assigned leader groups, leaders were not rated as being more intelligent than other group members. In contrast, in unassigned leader groups, there was a strong associated between perceived intelligence and leader emergence.
- In another study by Anita L. Blanchard titled "Testing a sense of a model of a community" talks about group salience being higher on a virtual community, thus, reaffirming the hyperpersonal model assumptions.

=== Social anxiety ===
- Andrew C. High and Scott E. Caplan(2008) explore the application of hyperpersonal model in the context of mitigating social anxiety caused by the "desire to create a positive impression in social settings along with a general lack of self-presentational confidence." The result indicated that the association of social anxiety and people's perception of social anxiety and the association of social anxiety and one's partner's conversational satisfaction are contingent in CMC.

=== Application in traditional communication tools ===
- In a 2006 study on politeness of requests made via email and voicemail, Kirk Duthler determined that emails were ranked more polite because users had more time to compose their requests compared to the voicemail user. Duthler's study supports hyperpersonal theory. He said: "The filtering of nonverbal cues advantages communicators. Communicators are strategically enabled to manipulate their identity, time the transmission of their messages, and plan, organize, and edit their communication in pursuit of relational goals. Such strategic control in CMC can facilitate negotiation, relationship development, and social tasks."
- In his thesis "Text messaging: The new venue of self-disclosure" in 2010, Steven Brunner thoroughly studied the text messaging as a relational enhancing device, from the perspectives of hyperpersonal theory, social penetration theory, and others.

=== Marketing ===
- The evolution route of marketing has gone "from big and broad to small and hyperpersonal". The interaction between customers and business processes in microlevel conversation through a hyper-personalized experience.

== Critique ==
Joyce Lamerichs and Hedwig F. M. Te Molder from the department of communication science at Wageningen University and Research Centre evaluate the ways in which computer-mediated communication (CMC) has thus far been conceptualized, proposing an alternative approach. They argue that traditional perspectives ignore participants' everyday understanding of media use and media characteristics by relying on an individualistic and cognitive framework. The social identity model of deindividuation effects model totally disregards identity construction in daily communication activities like talk, text & email. In order to understand this they tried to re study online interaction and specifically studied an online forum on depression. It is shown that participants' identities do not so much mirror their inner worlds but are discourse practices in their own right.

== Related theory ==
=== Daft & Lengel's media richness theory ===
Daft and Lengel's media richness theory first began in the setting of organizations to evaluate media channels within. The theory describes having a set of organizational communication channels with objectives that enable researchers to determine the capacity of rich information. According to Daft and Lengel, they believe communication channels such as email and phone recede the necessary abilities to convey messages that use rich information.

=== Kock's media naturalness and channel expansion theory ===
Ned Kock is a researcher of the media naturalness and channel expansion theory (CET). In 2004, Kock originally argued that humans were not equipped to deal with CMC when compared to "richer" forms of communication like FtF interactions. He reasoned this by stating that people evolved in FtF communication and have not had time to evolve into being equally adequate CMC communicators. The Channel Expansion Theory challenges Kock's view of evolutionary changes. CET illustrates how a person is able to develop certain perceptions of a new media channel. In contrast, in 2011, Kock revisits the issue of Media Naturalness in light of the Channel Expansion theory and, in turn, argues that Media Naturalness and CET can co-exist. Kock finally concludes that CMC interactions can achieve "positive effects" when compared to an equivalent FtF interaction, in the case of distance learning.

=== SIDE model ===
SIDE model is a recent development of deindividuation theory, refers to social identity/deindividuation model. It demonstrates that it is that the property of group identity increases, rather other that individual identity loses, that leading to the occurring changes of CMC users. SIDE model predicts that in CMC, the sense of self diminishes, while the sense of group increases. SIDE model is distinguished from classical deindividuation theory which put its focus on the sense of self rather than the sense of group identity.

=== Impression management ===
In the work titled 'The Presentation of Self in Everyday Life' (1959), Goffman demonstrated that in FtF communication, people use verbal and nonverbal languages to present appropriately and favorably to others since they care about the image or impression they leave for others and others' perception towards them. This phenomenon is called impression management. While in text-based CMC, the modification of impression is limited to "language, typographic, and chronemic information."

=== Deindividuation ===
Deindividuation is a social psychology theory being generally thought as the loss of self-awareness in groups, though this is a matter of contention.

=== Interpersonal communication ===
Interpersonal communication is a process of information exchange between two or more people. This research generally contributes to six categories of inquiry: 1) how humans adapt their verbal communication and nonverbal communication during face-to-face communication, 2) the message production processes. 3) how uncertainty influences our behavior and information-management strategies, 4) deceptive communication, 5) relational dialectics, and 6) social interaction that is mediated by technology.

=== Media richness theory ===
Media richness theory, also sometimes referred to as information richness theory/MRT, is introduced by Richard L. Daft and Robert H. Lengel in 1986 as an extension of information processing theory. It is a framework aiming to describe a communication medium's ability in reproducing the information sent over it.

=== Nonverbal communication ===
Nonverbal communication is communication process sending and receiving information in the form of wordless cues.

=== Politeness theory ===
Politeness theory explains the redressing of affronts by face-threatening acts to a person's "face". This concept of face is originally generated from Chinese and then into English in the 19th century.

=== Social information processing theory ===
Also known as SIP, Social information processing theory is an interpersonal communication theory and media studies developed by Joseph Walther in 1992.
