= Joseph Walther =

Communications professor

- Born: Joseph B. Walther; 1958 (age 67–68)
- Education: University of Arizona
- Occupation: Professor
- Writing career
- Subjects: Communication; Computer-mediated communication
- Website: www.comm.ucsb.edu/people/joe-walther

Joseph B. Walther (born 1958) is the Mark and Susan Bertelsen Presidential Chair in Technology and Society and the Director of the Center for Information Technology & Society at the University of California, Santa Barbara. His research focuses on social and interpersonal dynamics of computer-mediated communication, in groups, personal relationships, organizational and educational settings. He is noted for creating social information processing theory in 1992 and the hyperpersonal model in 1996.

== Life and work ==
Hyperpersonal Model

Joseph B. Walther was born in 1958 in Santa Monica, Calif. Walther attended Santa Ana College, Saddleback College and spent time with the Royal Shakespeare Company at Coastline Community College before transferring to the University of Arizona and graduating magna cum laude in 1983. Walther continued at the University of Arizona, earning a master's degree in speech communication in 1984 and a doctorate in 1990.

Walther has previously held appointments in Information Technology, Psychology, and Education and Social Policy at universities in the U.S. and the United Kingdom and was chair of the Organizational Communication and Information Systems division of the Academy of Management, and the Communication and Technology division of the International Communication Association.

Based on his research into computer-mediated communication, Walther introduced social information processing theory in 1992. Social information processing theory finds that the development of relationships via computer-mediated communication depends on sufficient time and message exchanges, and on the application of available communicative cues by users. The lack of nonverbal cues means that computer-mediated communications contain less information than face-to-face communications, however social information processing theory finds that longer and/or more frequent communication as well as the use of other cues (i.e. spelling ability) while participating in computer-mediated communication help address the issue of information exchange.

The social information perspective assumes that communicators in computer-mediated exchanges are similarly driven to acquire social information that will encourage the development of social relationships as are communicators using other media. Support for social information processing theory has been found in contexts such as online dating and online multi-player video games.

Walther's research also led him to develop the hyperpersonal model of communication in 1996. Walther's work on the hyperpersonal model is his research that has been most cited by other researchers. The hyperpersonal model finds that in certain circumstances, computer-mediated communication surpasses the affection and emotion of similar situations of face-to-face interpersonal communication. This model also offers a robust view of computer-mediated communication, taking into account the contributions of the sender, receiver, channel and feedback in a computer-mediated interaction.

The hyperpersonal model finds that two characteristics of computer-mediated communication – reduced communication cues and potentially asynchronous communication – facilitate both optimized self-presentation by message senders and idealized perceptions of the sender by message receivers. Walther's hyperpersonal model predicts that media classified as less rich by media richness theory or less natural by media naturalness theory allow more socially desirable levels of interaction than face-to-face communication.

== Academic appointments ==
- 1990-1992: Assistant Professor, Dept. of Communication, University of Oklahoma
- Fall 1995: Visiting Professor, Dept. of Psychology, University of Manchester
- 1992-1997: Assistant Professor of Communication Studies, Northwestern University
- 1995-1996: Ameritech Research Professor, Northwestern University
- 1995-1997: Assistant Professor of Education and Social Policy, Northwestern University
- Spring, 1999: Adjunct Associate Professor (Virtual) of Communication Studies, University of Kansas
- 1997-2002: Associate Professor in Language, Literature, & Communication, Social Psychology, and Information Technology, Rensselaer Polytechnic Institute
- May, 2005: Visiting Professor, School of Communication Studies, Kent State University
- 2002-2006: Associate Professor, Professor in Communication, Information Science, Cornell University
- 2006- 2013: Professor, Dept. of Communication, Michigan State University & Professor, Dept. of Telecommunication, Information Studies and Media, Michigan State University
- 2013 - 2017: Wee Kim Wee Professor, Division of Communication Research, Nanyang Technological University
- 2017- Present: Mark and Susan Bertelsen Presidential Chair in Technology and Society; Director of the Center for Information Technology & Society, UC Santa Barbara

== Bibliography ==
Selected works:

- Walther, Joseph B. (February 1992). "Interpersonal Effects in Computer-Mediated Interaction: A Relational Perspective". Communication Research. 19 (1): 52–90. doi:10.1177/009365092019001003.
- Walther, Joseph B.; Judee K. Burgoon (September 1992). "Relational Communication in Computer-Mediated Interaction" (PDF). Human Communication Research. 19 (1): 50–88. doi:10.1111/j.1468-2958.1992.tb00295.x. hdl:10150/185294.
- Walther, Joseph B. (March 1995). "Relational Aspects of Computer-mediated Communication: Experimental Observations over Time". Organization Science. 6 (2): 186–203. doi:10.1287/orsc.6.2.186.
- Walther, Joseph B. (February 1996). "Computer-Mediated Communication: Impersonal, Interpersonal, and Hyperpersonal Interaction". Communication Research. 23 (1): 3–43. doi:10.1177/009365096023001001.
- Walther, Joseph B. (March 1997). "Group and Interpersonal Effects in International Computer-Mediated Collaboration". Human Communication Research. 23 (3): 342–369. doi:10.1111/j.1468-2958.1997.tb00400.x.
- Walther, Joseph B.; Kyle P. D'Addario (2001). "The Impacts of Emoticons on Message Interpretation in Computer-Mediated Communication". Social Science Computer Review. 19 (3): 324–347. doi:10.1177/089443930101900307.
- Walther, Joseph B.; Ulla Bunz (December 2005). "The Rules of Virtual Groups: Trust, Liking, and Performance in Computer-Mediated Communication". Journal of Communication. 55 (4): 828–846. doi:10.1111/j.1460-2466.2005.tb03025.x.
- Walther, Joseph B. (September 2007). "Selective self-presentation in computer-mediated communication: Hyperpersonal dimensions of technology, language, and cognition". Computers in Human Behavior. 23 (5): 2538–2557. doi:10.1016/j.chb.2006.05.002.
- Westerman, David; Brandon Van Der Heide; Katherine A. Klein; Joseph B. Walther (April 2008). "How do people really seek information about others?: Information seeking across Internet and traditional communication channels". Journal of Computer-Mediated Communication. 13 (3): 751–767. doi:10.1111/j.1083-6101.2008.00418.x.
- Tong, Stephanie Tom; Joseph B. Walther (June 2011). "Just say "no thanks": Romantic rejection in computer-mediated communication". Journal of Social and Personal Relationships. 28 (4): 488–506. doi:10.1177/0265407510384895.

== See also ==
- Social information processing (theory)
- Hyperpersonal model
- Computer-mediated communication
- Warranting theory
- Relational Maintenance and CMC - Tie Signs
