= Deindividuation =

Concept in social psychology

Deindividuation is a concept in social psychology that is generally thought of as the loss of self-awareness in groups, although this is a matter of contention. For the social psychologist, the level of analysis is the individual in the context of a social situation. As such, social psychologists emphasize the role of internal psychological processes. Other social scientists, such as sociologists, are more concerned with broad social, economic, political, and historical factors that influence events in a given society.

== Overview ==
Deindividuation theory seeks to provide an explanation for a variety of antinormative collective behavior, such as witch hunts, violent crowds and lynch mobs. There are a range of perspectives on the role deindividuation plays in producing anti-normative behaviors, and how contextual cues affect the rules of the deindividuation construct; it is proposed that it is a psychological state of decreased apprehension and self-evaluation, reducing inhibition and enabling antinormative behavior in participants. Deindividuation has also been suggested as a factor enabling genocide, as well as an explanation for antinormative behavior online in computer-mediated communications.

Although generally analyzed in the context of negative behaviors, deindividuation has also been found to play a role in positive behaviors and experiences.

== Major theoretical approaches and history ==
In contemporary social psychology, deindividuation refers to a diminishing of one's sense of individuality that occurs with behavior disjointed from personal or social standards of conduct. For example, someone who is an anonymous member of a mob will be more likely to act violently toward a police officer than a known individual. In one sense, a deindividuated state may be considered appealing if someone is affected such that he or she feels free to behave impulsively without mind to potential consequences. However, deindividuation has also been linked to "violent and anti-social behavior."

=== Classic theories ===
Gustave Le Bon was an early explorer of this phenomenon as a function of crowds. Le Bon introduced his crowd psychology theory in his 1895 publication The Crowd: A study of the Popular Mind. The French psychologist characterized his posited effect of crowd mentality, whereby individual personalities become dominated by the collective mindset of the crowd. Le Bon viewed crowd behavior as "unanimous, emotional, and intellectually weak." He theorized that a loss of personal responsibility in crowds leads to an inclination to behave primitively and hedonistically by the entire group. This resulting mentality, according to Le Bon, belongs more to the collective than any individual, so that individual traits are submerged. Already, Le Bon was tending toward the conception of deindividuation as a state brought on by a lowering of accountability, resulting from a degree of anonymity due to membership within a crowd, where attention is shifted from the self to the more stimulating, external qualities of the group's action (which may be extreme).

Essentially, individuals of Le Bon's crowd are enslaved to the group's mindset and are capable of conducting the most violent and heroic acts. Le Bon's group-level explanation of behavioral phenomena in crowds inspired further theories regarding collective psychology from Freud, McDougall, Blumer, and Allport. Festinger, Pepitone, and Newcomb revisited Le Bon's ideas in 1952, coining the term deindividuation to describe what happens when persons within a group are not treated as individuals. According to these theorists, whatever attracts each member to a particular group causes them to put more emphasis on the group than on individuals. This unaccountability inside a group has the effect of "reducing inner restraints and increasing behavior that is usually inhibited." Festinger et al. agreed with Le Bon's perception of behavior in a crowd in the sense that they believed individuals do become submerged into the crowd leading to their reduced accountability. However, these relatively modern theorists distinguished deindividuation from crowd theory by reforming the idea that the loss of individuality within a crowd is replaced by the group's mindset. Instead, Festinger et al. argued that the loss of individuality leads to loss of control over internal or moral constraints.

Alternatively, R. C. Ziller (1964) argued that individuals are subject to deindividuation under more specific situational conditions. For instance, he suggested that under rewarding conditions, individuals have the learned incentive to exhibit individualized qualities in order to absorb credit for themselves; whereas, under punishing conditions, individuals have the learned tendency to become deindividuated through submergence into the group as a means of diffusing responsibility.

P. G. Zimbardo (1969) suggested "the expression of normally inhibited behavior" may have both positive and negative consequences. He expanded the proposed realm of factors that contribute to deindividuation, beyond anonymity and loss of personal responsibility, to include: "arousal, sensory overload, a lack of contextual structure or predictability, and altered consciousness due to drugs or alcohol", as well as "altered time perspectives... and degree of involvement in group functioning." Zimbardo postulated that these factors lead to "loss of identity or loss of self-consciousness", which result in unresponsiveness to external stimuli by the individual and the loss of "cognitive control over motivations and emotions." Consequently, individuals reduce their compliance with good and bad sanctions held by influences outside the group.

Zimbardo was consistent with Festinger et al. in his suggestion that loss of individuality leads to a loss of control, causing affected persons to behave intensely and impulsively, having let go of internal restraints. However, he developed this model by specifying the "input variables" (situational factors) that lead to this loss of individuality, as well as the nature of behaviors that result (emotional, impulsive, and regressive). Zimbardo further developed existing deindividuation theory by suggesting these outcome behaviors are "self-reinforcing" and therefore difficult to cease. Moreover, Zimbardo did not restrict his application to group situations; he also applied deindividuation theory to "suicide, murder, and interpersonal hostility."

=== Contemporary theories ===
In the late seventies, Ed Diener began to express dissatisfaction with the current deindividuation hypothesis, which he deemed invalid without specific focus on the psychological processes that yield a deindividuated state. Not only was Zimbardo's model deficient in that respect, but the role of his input variables in causing anti-normative behaviors was not uniform. Consequently, Diener took it upon himself to refine Zimbardo's model by specifying further the internal processes which lead to deindividuation. In 1980, he argued that paying attention to one's personal values through self-awareness increases the ability of that person to self-regulate. In a group context, when attention is distributed outward (in line with this model) away from the self, the individual loses the ability to plan his actions rationally and substitutes planned behaviors with a heightened responsiveness to environmental cues. Thus, according to Diener, the reduction of self-awareness is the "defining feature of deindividuation". Diener proposed that the strict focus on anonymity as the primary factor of deindividuation had created an empirical obstacle, calling for a redirection of empirical research on the topic.

While Diener was able to take the focus away from anonymity in the theoretical evolution of deindividuation, he was unable to empirically clarify the function of reduced self-awareness in causing disinhibited behavior. In response to this ambiguity, Prentice-Dunn and Rogers (1982, 1989) extended Diener's model by distinguishing public self-awareness from private self-awareness. Public self-awareness they theorized to be reduced by "accountability cues", such as diffusion of responsibility or anonymity. Such factors, according to these theorists, cause members of a crowd to lose a sense of consequences for their actions; thus, they worry less about being evaluated and do not anticipate punishment. Private self-awareness (where attention is shifted away from the self), however, was reduced by "attentional cues", e.g., group cohesiveness and physiological arousal. This reduction leads to "an internal deindividuated state" (comprising decreased private self-awareness and altered thinking as a natural by-product) that causes "decreased self-regulation and attention to internalized standards for appropriate behavior". The "differential self-awareness" theorists suggested both forms of self-awareness could lead to "antinormative and disinhibited behavior" but only the decreased private self-awareness process was in their definition of deindividuation.

=== SIDE ===
The most recent model of deindividuation, the social identity model of deindividuation effects (SIDE), was developed by Russell Spears and Martin Lea in 1995. The SIDE model argues that deindividuation manipulations can have the effect of decreasing attention to individual characteristics and interpersonal differences within the group. They outlined their model by explaining that social identity performance can fulfill two general functions:

1. Affirming, conforming, or strengthening individual or group identities.
2. Persuading audiences into adopting specific behaviors.

This model attempts to make sense of a range of deindividuation effects which were derived from situational factors such as group immersion, anonymity, and reduced identifiability. Therefore, deindividuation is the increased salience of a group identity that can result from the manipulation of such factors. The SIDE model contrasts other deindividuation explanations which involve the reduced impact of the self. Further explanations by Reicher et al. state that deindividuation manipulations affect norm endorsement through not only their impact on self-definition, but also their influence on power relations between group members and their audience.

Classical and contemporary approaches agree on the main component of deindividuation theory that deindividuation leads to "anti-normative and disinhibited behavior".

== Major empirical discoveries ==
=== Milgram (1963) ===
Stanley Milgram's experiment is a classic study of blind obedience; however, it also explicitly illustrates characteristics of situations in which deindividuation is likely to occur. Participants were taken into a room and sat in front of a board of fake controls. They were then told by the experimenter that they were completing a task on learning and that they were to read a list of word pairs to the "learner" and then test the learner on accuracy. The participant then read a word and four possible matches. If the confederate got the match wrong, they were to administer a shock (which was not real, unbeknownst to the participant) from the fake control panel they were sitting in front of. After each wrong answer, the intensity of the shock increased. The participant was instructed by the experimenter to continue to administer the shocks, stating that it was their duty in the experiment. As the voltage increased, the confederate began to complain of pain, yelled out discomfort, and eventually screamed the pain was too much and sometimes they even began to bang on the wall. At the greatest amount of voltage administered, the confederate stopped speaking at all. The results of the study showed that 65 percent of experiment participants administered the experiment's final, and most severe, 450-volt shock. Only 1 participant refused to administer shocks past the 300-volt level. The participants, covered by a veil of anonymity, were able to be more aggressive in this situation than they possibly would have in a normal setting. Additionally, this is a classic example of diffusion of responsibility in that participants looked to an authority figure (the experimenter) instead of being self-aware of the pain they were causing or engaging in self-evaluation which may have caused them to adhere to societal norms.

=== Philip Zimbardo (1969) ===
This study prompted Zimbardo to write his initial theory and model of deindividuation based on the results of his research. In one study, participants in the experimental condition were made to be anonymous by being issued large coats and hoods which largely concealed their identity. These New York University women were dressed up like Ku Klux Klan members in groups of four. In contrast, the participants in the control condition wore normal clothes and name tags. Each participant was brought into a room and given the task of "shocking" a confederate in another room at different levels of severity ranging from mild to dangerous (similar to Stanley Milgram's study in 1963). Zimbardo noted that participants who were in the anonymous condition "shocked" the confederates longer, which would have caused more pain in a real situation, than those in the non-anonymous control group. However, a second study using soldiers was done which showed the exact opposite results. When the soldiers were identifiable, they shocked longer than the unidentifiable soldiers. Zimbardo proposed that as a result of anonymity, the soldiers may have felt isolated from their fellow soldiers. These studies motivated Zimbardo to examine this deindividuation and aggression in a prison setting, which is discussed in the next study listed.

=== Philip Zimbardo (1971) ===
Now a more widely recognized study since the publication of his book, The Lucifer Effect, the Stanford Prison Experiment is infamous for its blatant display of aggression in deindividuated situations. Zimbardo created a mock prison environment in the basement of Stanford University's psychology building in which he randomly assigned 24 men to undertake the role of either guard or prisoner. These men were specifically chosen because they had no abnormal personality traits (e.g., narcissistic, authoritarian, antisocial). The experiment, originally planned to span over two weeks, ended after only six days because of the sadistic treatment of the prisoners by the guards. Zimbardo attributed this behavior to deindividuation due to immersion within the group and creation of a strong group dynamic. Several elements added to the deindividuation of both guards and prisoners. Prisoners were made to dress alike, wearing stocking caps and hospital dressing gowns, and also were identified only by a number assigned to them rather than by their name. Guards were also given uniforms and reflective glasses which hid their faces. The dress of guards and prisoners led to a type of anonymity on both sides because the individual identifying characteristics of the men were taken out of the equation. Additionally, the guards had the added element of diffusion of responsibility which gave them the opportunity to remove personal responsibility and place it on a higher power. Several guards commented that they all believed that someone else would have stopped them if they were truly crossing the line, so they continued with their behavior. Critics have questioned the validity of the experiment.

=== Diener, Fraser, Beaman, and Kelem (1976) ===
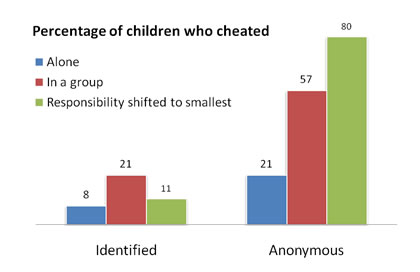
A graph showing the results of a study (Diener, 1976) on the effects of anonymity on cheating

In this classic study, Diener et al. had a woman place a bowl of candy in her living room for trick-or-treaters. An observer was placed out of sight from the children in order to record the behaviors of the trick-or-treaters. In one condition, the woman asked the children identification questions such as where they lived, who their parents were, what their name was, etc. In the other condition, children were completely anonymous. The observer also recorded whether children came individually or in a group. In each condition, the woman invited the children in, claimed she had something in the kitchen she had to tend to so she had to leave the room, and then instructed each child to take only one piece of candy. The anonymous group condition far outnumbered the other conditions in terms of how many times they took more than one piece of candy. In 60% of cases, the anonymous group of children took more than one piece, sometimes even the entire bowl of candy. The anonymous individual and the identified group condition tied for second, taking more than one piece of candy 20% of the time. The condition which broke the rule the fewest times was the identified individual condition, which took more than one piece of candy only in 10% of cases.

=== Nadler, A., Goldberg, M., Jaffe, Y. (1982) ===
This study by Nadler, Goldberg, and Jaffe measured the effects that deindividuating conditions (anonymity vs. identifiable) had on two subject conditions (self-differentiated vs. undifferentiated individuals). The self-differentiated individual is said to have definite boundaries between inner characteristics identified as self and the social environment. In the undifferentiated individual, such a distinction is less marked. Subjects who were preselected as being self-differentiated or undifferentiated were observed under conditions of high or low anonymity. Each subject was exposed to transgressions and donations made by confederates, and then their own transgressive and prosocial actions were measured. Also, measures of verbal aggression directed toward the experimenter and measures of internal state of deindividuation were taken. Major findings of the study:

- Within the undifferentiated groups, a greater frequency of subsequent subject transgressive behavior occurred in the anonymity more than in the identifiability conditions.
- Undifferentiated individuals are affected by deindividuating circumstances and they tend to transgress more after observing the model in the experiment.
- In terms of verbal aggression, self-differentiated individuals' level of verbal aggression was equal under anonymity and identifiability conditions. However, undifferentiated individuals tended to model the confederates' aggression and were more verbally aggressive when anonymous than when identifiable.
- The study found that undifferentiated individuals were less self-conscious and less inhibited in the anonymity condition.

Overall, the study supports the hypothesis that deindividuating conditions cause behavioral changes in undifferentiated individuals but have relatively little effect on the behavior of self-differentiated individuals.

=== Dodd, D. (1985) ===
Dodd's experiment evaluates the association between deindividuation and anonymity. Dodd measured his subjects by asking them what they would do (within the realm of reality) if their identity were kept anonymous and they would receive no repercussions. The responses were grouped into four categories: prosocial, antisocial, nonnormative, and neutral. Results of his study yielded that 36% of the responses were antisocial, 19% nonnormative, 36% neutral and only 9% prosocial. The most frequent responses recorded were criminal acts. This study on deindividuation exhibits the importance of situational factors, in this case anonymity, when reporting antisocial behavior. Furthermore, this study demonstrates that personal traits and characteristics are not much of predictor when predicting the behavior. Overall, this study is supportive of the concept of deindividuation as Dodd found that behavior changes from what would be normal of a certain individual, to a behavior that is not representative of normal behavioral decisions.

=== Reicher, S., Levine, R. M., Gordijn, E. (1998) ===
Following the social models of identity proposed by deindividuation, the study conducted by Reicher, Levine and Gordijn expresses the strategic effects of visibility on the in-group. The experimenters suggest that increasing visibility amongst the in-group members subsequently increases their ability to support each other against the outgroup—this also leads to an increase in the traits of the in-group that would normally be sanctioned by the out-group. The study was based on the debate over whether fox hunting should or should not be banned. The experimenters were mainly concerned with the participants that defined themselves as 'anti-hunting'. The participants involved thirty male and female students of the mean age of 17 years in the first year of their A-level psychology course located in a rural town in South West England. The study involved two separate sessions where the participants completed a pre-test and were assigned to the pro- or anti- hunting groups. A spokesperson representing each view was brought in to discuss their opinions individually with each participant. The pro-hunting group was taken to another room and did not take further part in the study. For the in-group low-visibility condition, part of the anti-hunting participants were taken to individual booths where they were not visible to others in the experiment. The remaining anti-hunting participants who were categorized under the in-group high visibility condition, were seated in a circle where each was visible to all throughout the experiment. At this point both groups were shown a video. After watching the video the participants were handed a questionnaire. They were asked to write their names on the front so that the out-group spokesperson would be able to identify the authors of the questionnaire before discussing the comments individually. To the experimenters' surprise the experiment demonstrated the inverse of their hypothesis. The study showed that more participants were more likely to express normative behaviors that are punishable by powerful out-group when they are visible to fellow members of the same in-group. Experimenters also found that in-group participants actually expressed opposition to the roles imposed by the experimenters themselves. Instead of just uniting against hunt, some of the in-group participants resented being told that their group supported certain views—some regarded themselves as moderate pro- or anti- hunters instead. In this case, the experimenters themselves triggered a response from the in-group, which was later analyzed through follow up experiments.

=== Lee, E.J. (2007) ===
This study conducted by Lee investigates the effects of deindividuation on group polarization. Group polarization refers to the finding that following group discussion, individuals tend to endorse a more extreme position in the direction already favored by the group. In Lee's study subjects were either assigned to a deindividuation or individuation condition. Next, each subject answered questions and provided an argument about a given dilemma. They were then shown their partners' decisions and the subjects were asked to indicate how convincing and valid the overall arguments were. In analyzing her results, Lee came to several conclusions:

- Group identification was positively correlated with group polarization.
- Lee confirmed her hypothesis that the subjects would show stronger group identification and greater opinion polarization when deindividuated than when individuated.
- Lee found that the more the participants identified with their partners, the more positive their evaluations of the partners' arguments were, manifesting in-group favoritism.
- Lee's findings suggest that both higher group identification and deindividuated subjects reported a significantly higher level of public-self-awareness.

Overall, this study provides solid research for which the previous findings regarding deindividuation can be solidified. The finding that deindividuation was associated with stronger group polarization and identification corresponds with the basis of deindividuation: individuals that are more polarized and identified with a group will be more apt to act out of character and display anti-normative behavior.

== In online environments ==
This phenomenon has been observed in various online platforms such as social media, comment sections and multiplayer games. Some psychologists suggest that deindividuation leads to more antinormative and aggressive behaviour due to online group immersion compared to an individual's behaviour when alone. In online environments, effects of deindividuation can be amplified by factors such as anonymity, reduced social cues, group size and dynamics and lack of immediate consequences. These mechanisms can encourage disinhibition and hostile behaviour, leading to negative implications such as cyberbullying. However, the same mechanisms can also promote prosocial behaviour and allow individuals to express themselves without any fear of judgement or criticism. Therefore, there are positive implications of deindividuation in online environments such as group solidarity and enhanced creativity.

=== Reduced Social Cues ===
When communicating digitally, an individual cannot receive the feedback on their actions which is normally presented in face-to-face interactions through nonverbal social cues such as facial expressions or body language. As a result it is harder to judge and understand how one's behaviour affects others. Studies have shown that social cues help to reduce ambiguity of person impressions. Therefore, the reduced social cues in digital communication mean that individuals are less certain of the impact that their actions have on others. This can increase the likelihood of individuals dehumanising others and engaging in hostile behaviour.

The lack of non-verbal social cues can diminish the constraints on hostile behaviour, encouraging people to show less concern and disregard social norms. When using text-based communication platforms such as 'X', this reduced concern for social norms may lead to individuals using hostile language and hate speech.

Studies have also shown the unidirectional feedback from an anonymous to trigger conformity behaviour in groups. According to literature, group conformity in online settings displays both positive and negative effects depending on the social norms of the group.

=== Group Dynamics ===
In online settings, as in face-to-face settings, the most influential factor of a group on deindividuation is its size. Some examples of large collectives online may include forums, gaming communities or chat rooms. Deindividuation theory argues that increasing the size of the group, increases the degree of anonymity, which leads to deindividuation. In online environments, being part of a large group provides individuals with a sense of belonging. This can lead the individual to lose their unique identity and instead adopt the social norms of the group, above all if these norms promote aggressive behaviour. This is supported by the SIDE approach to deindividuation which predicts that when aggressive behaviour is an option, the salience of the aggressive norm in a large group will be stronger than that of a small group. A study of the SIDE theory in aggressive conditions supports this prediction, and therefore highlights the impact of group size on deindividuation.

Large group interactions online can also lead to individuals exhibiting extreme behaviour as a result of group polarisation. If the group has extreme norms and tendencies, the individual is likely to escalate their own behaviours to align with them. This is particularly prevalent in online political forums where individuals reinforce one another's polarised viewpoints with even more extreme comments.

== Applications ==
Deindividuation is the perceived loss of individuality and personal responsibility that can occur when someone participates as part of a group. It can cause a person to be more likely to donate a large amount of money to charity, but also cause them to be more likely to engage in mob violence. There are many real-world instances in which the effects of deindividuation can be seen. Deindividuation can occur in as varied instances as in the police force, the military, the internet, sports teams, gangs, cults, and social organizations. Although they may seem very different on the surface, these groups share many traits that make them conducive to, and even contingent on, deindividuation. All of the examples share the strong drive towards group cohesiveness.

Police officers, soldiers, and sports teams all wear uniforms that create a distinct in-group while eliminating the individual differences of personal style. Men in the military are even required to shave their heads in order to better unify their appearance. Although gangs, cults, and fraternities and sororities do not require the same degree of physical uniformity, they also display this tendency towards unifying the exterior in order to unify their group. For example, gangs may have a symbol that they tattoo on their bodies in order to identify themselves as part of the in-group of their gang. Members of fraternities and sororities often wear clothing marked with their "letters" so that they can quickly be identified as part of their specific group. By reducing individual differences, these various groups become more cohesive.

The cohesiveness of a group can make its members lose their sense of self in the overwhelming identity of the group. For example, a young man in the military might identify himself through a variety of individual constructs, however while in uniform with a shaved head and dog tags around his neck, he might suddenly only identify himself as a soldier. Likewise, a young woman wearing the letters of her sorority on her shirt, and standing in a crowd of her sorority sisters, may feel less like herself, and more like a "Chi-Oh" or "Tridelt". Physically normalized to the standards of their respective groups, these various group members are all at risk to feel deindividuized. They may begin to think of themselves as a mere part of the group, and lose the awareness that they are an individual with the capacity to think and act completely separately from their group. They could do things they might not usually do out of shyness, individual morality, self-consciousness, or other factors. Due to reduced feelings of accountability, and increased feelings of group cohesion and conformity, these group members could act in a manner of non-normative ways.

Deindividuation often occurs without face-to-face interaction and is a prevalent feature of the internet. The loosening of normal constraints on behavior caused by deindividuation thrives within online environments and contributes to cyberbullying behavior. Furthermore, deindividuation which occurs online has been thought to be responsible for a widespread willingness to illegally download software. One researcher tested the hypothesis that "persons who prefer the anonymity and pseudonymity associated with interaction on the Internet are more likely to pirate software", but found that neither anonymity nor pseudonymity predicted self-reported software piracy. From buying drinks for an entire bar of strangers to committing violence as dire as murder or rape, deindividuation can lead a variety of people to act in ways they may have thought impossible.

== Controversies ==
Questions have been raised about the external validity of deindividuation research. As deindividuation has evolved as a theory, some researchers feel that the theory has lost sight of the dynamic group intergroup context of collective behavior that it attempts to model. Some propose that deindividuation effects may actually be a product of group norms; crowd behavior is guided by norms that emerge in a specific context. More generally, it seems odd that while deindividuation theory argues that group immersion causes antinormative behavior, research in social psychology has also shown that the presence of a group produces conformity to group norms and standards. Certain experiments, such as Milgram's obedience studies (1974), demonstrate conformity to the experimenter's demands; however the research paradigm in this experiment is very similar to some employed in deindividuation studies, except the role of the experimenter is usually not taken into account in such instances.

A larger criticism is that our conception of the antinormative behaviors which deindividuation causes is based on social norms, which is problematic because norms by nature are variable and situation specific. For instance, Johnson and Downing (1979) demonstrated that group behaviors vary greatly depending on the situation. Participants who dressed in Ku Klux Klan robes shocked a research confederate more, but participants dressed as nurses actually shocked less regardless of whether they were identifiable or anonymous. They explained these results as a product of contextual cues, namely the costumes. This explanation runs counter to Zimbardo's initial theory of deindividuation which states that deindividuation increases antinormative behavior regardless of external cues. Researchers who examine deindividuation effects within the context of situational norms support a social identity model of deindividuation effects.

== See also ==
- Cultural assimilation
- Dissociative identity disorder
- Groupshift
- Groupthink
- Identity crisis
- Social facilitation
- Social loafing
