= Warranting theory =

Within sociology, Warranting theory is a theory adapted by Joseph B. Walther and Malcolm Parks from the works of Stone.

Warranting theory contends information which is immune to manipulation by the target to whom it refers is considered more valuable than information which the target has control over. The greater the potential for misrepresentation, the more likely observers are to be skeptical of the presented information. Warrants in this manner are cues that an observer uses to gauge the accuracy of a person's given information or profile.

== Notable article ==
Walther and Parks (2002) observed a phenomenon in which people met offline after having first met online. Sometimes these experiences were positive, and other times they were negative. Walther and Parks (2002) were dissatisfied with existing theories' ability to explain these phenomena. To fill in the theoretical gap, Walther and Parks (2002) adapted the original concept of warranting presented by Stone (1995), describing connections between one's self and self-presentation as a continuum rather than a binary, moderated by anonymity. They suggested that the potential for anonymity resulted in the potential for a discrepancy along this continuum. The greater this potential discrepancy, the more compelling it is for observers to be skeptical of information provided by the individual about the self (Walther & Parks, 2002). Warrants, as described by Walther and Parks (2002), are perceived reliable cues that observers use to gauge how one's true identity matches that which is presented online.

However, not all of these cues are weighted equally; rather, warrants possess a warranting value (Walther & Parks, 2002). This value is defined as the extent to which the cue is perceived to be unaltered by the target. Warrants that are very difficult to manipulate by the user are considered high in warranting value, while those that are easily changed have a low warranting value and are therefore much more questionable in terms of accuracy (Walther & Parks, 2002). For example, an article written about an individual has a higher warranting value than a social profile created by the same individual.

Walther and Parks (2002) speculated that being able to obtain information from a partner's social network would increase the warrants within an online relationship. Because information from others is of high warranting value, it stands to reason that those invested in a potential online relationship would use available resources, in this case social networks, to alleviate any skepticism about the accuracy of claims made by a relational partner.

Warrants do not necessarily have to be provided or controlled by others. Walther and Parks (2002) introduced the concept of partial warranting. This is information that, though provided by the user, contains easily verifiable facts. For example, the presentation of one's given name is a partial warrant, as this information can be used to look up public records or link to other profiles the user may possess. Providing numerical information, such as height, weight, age, or address, also constitutes as partial warranting, as these figures are easily checked and provide little room for gray area.

== Existing research ==
=== Others-generated warrants ===
Much of the existing research regarding warranting examined how perception and judgments about an individual are influenced by others-generated information. Walther, Van Der Heide, Kim, Westerman, and Tong (2008), used fake Facebook profiles to assess if the attractiveness of friends, as well as what these friends said on an individual's profile, had an effect on social attraction. Profiles that were neutral in content displayed two comments from friends. The small profile pictures of commenting friends were either attractive or unattractive, and the comments suggested either socially desirable or socially undesirable behaviors (Walther et al., 2008).

It was found that social attractiveness was positively correlated with the physical attractiveness of commenting friends (Walther et al., 2008). This indicates that the simple observable presence of others in one's social network may be enough to make social judgments. Mixed results were found regarding actual content of friend's comments (Walther et al., 2008). A significant effect was found, although these effects depended on the gender of the profile owner. This confirms the assertion in warranting theory that comments made by others do indeed warrant judgments, but adds that these judgments may be moderated by the initial claims made by the target.

This study admittedly left a gap that required further research. While it confirmed that perceptions are influenced by others, the claims made by a user were very limited and purposefully neutral (Walther et al., 2008). Therefore, the authors were unable to make assertions about the power of others-generated cues over self-generated claims. A follow-up study addressed this issue.

Walther, Van Der Heide, Hamel, and Shulman, (2009) tested the effects of self-generated information against information generated by others. Walther et al. (2009) compared subjects reactions to fake Facebook profiles and their judgments of extroversion and introversion. Profiles contained either self-generated information suggesting the profile owner was introverted or extroverted, and others-generated statements suggesting the owner was introverted or extroverted. Information suggesting introversion was considered negative while information suggestion extroversion was considered to be positive. Walther et al. (2009) found that while others-generated statements do indeed have an effect on observer judgments, the effect did not override self-generated information or negativity effects.

Taking a further look at the effects of positive and negative statements with self versus others-generated information, Walther, Van Der Heide, Hamel, and Shulman (2009) replaced statements of introversion and extroversion with physical attractiveness. Subjects judged physical attractiveness of subjects based on information in the owner's profile and comments made by the owner's friends; pictures of owners were either male or female and were pre-tested to be at a neutral level of attractiveness.

Walther et al. (2009) found that when asked to make judgments of attractiveness, results were strongly in line with predictions made by warranting theory. Walther et al. (2009) explain the discrepancies in results between the two experiments by posing that perhaps more is going on when making judgments of internal versus external characteristics. It is possible that friend's judgments about personality are deemed less accurate than ones made by the person his or herself. This is likely due to the assumption that a person would know his or herself best, and may still perform activities associated with another temperament while still claiming to be the opposite; for example, a true introvert may still elect to go out with friends on occasion (Walther et al., 2009).

=== Social triangulation and partial warranting ===
Despite the introduction of partial warranting in the notable article, very little research focusing on this construct exists. Gibbs, Ellison, and Lai (2010) were the closest to studying partial warranting, or verifiable claims provided by the target, in isolation. Gibbs et al. (2010) studied warranting in the context of online dating profiles.

The study found that people in online dating situations tended to utilize web resources outside of the dating website to confirm partial warrants. For example, if a real full name was provided by a potential relational partner, users typed this information into search engines in order to retrieve public records or links to additional social-network site (SNS) profiles (Gibbs et al., 2010). This type of fact-checking was introduced as "social triangulation" (Gibbs et al., 2010). The authors speculated that this strategy would be common when "true warrants", or information uncontrolled by the user, are not available (Gibbs, et al., 2010).

=== Deception ===
Since the introduction of warranting theory, two studies have examined how deceptive a person may be in terms of information they may present and the degree of verifiability of their warrants.

Parks and Archey-Ladas (2003) examined a sample of 200 personal home pages, and coded the information provided by the users. To examine the data, Parks and Archey-Ladas (2003) looked at warrants (easily verified information) and constraining information (information that is not easily verified but restricts identity. Items include political activity and hobbies). Parks and Archey-Ladas (2003) found that despite the freedom afforded to users to create identities online, people quite frequently had many linkages between their online and offline lives on their personal home pages. While it is suggested by Parks and Archey-Ladas (2003) that people present verifiable information online, it is assumed that the information is honest, as Parks and Archey-Ladas did not actually follow up with an attempt to contact owners of pages. As such, this study only demonstrates people present verifiable information, but did not actually find out to what extent the present information was actually true.

Warkentin, Woodsworth, Hancock, and Cormier (2010) wondered if warranting potential in a medium influenced the presence of deceptive practices. They suspected that users of online media would be more truthful if others could easily catch them in a lie. A simple correlational study was conducted in which self-report survey answers regarding deception across mediums were compared to the warranting potential of each medium (Warkentin et al., 2010).

The hypotheses were confirmed. SNSs, which were found to have the highest warranting potential, also featured the least amount of self-reported deception. Synchronous chat, which scored the lowest in warranting potential, was reported to be the largest source of deceptive practices (Warkentin et al., 2010). From this study, it appears that people have an awareness of warranting by others, and act accordingly. Because this was a correlational study, these findings could have an alternate explanation.

=== Parks' boundary conditions ===
Parks (2011) presented three boundary conditions that must be present for true warranting to exist:

1. The target must simply make a claim regarding identity.
2. Members of the target's social network must be able to publicly comment on this claim.
3. Observers must be able to compare the claim and comment in a meaningful way.

Warranting capacity is not medium-specific, but instead may occur anywhere where these three conditions are met. Still, it is often assumed that certain types of computer-mediated communication (CMC) lend themselves more easily to these criteria than others. For example, SNSs have been at the epicenter of studies on warranting, suggesting that they are the ideal avenue for the examination of the theory. To explore this notion, Parks (2011) used a longitudinal study to explore whether a popular SNS, Myspace, met the three requirements.

Overwhelmingly, Myspace failed to satisfy even one of the boundary conditions (Parks, 2011). Members posted very little about their identity, made few social connections, and received few to no comments on their profiles (Parks, 2011). Although it could be argued that Myspace is becoming more of a business avenue than SNSs (Parks, 2011), this study still cautions against a medium-based understanding of warranting. Instead, individual cases should be measured against qualifying criterion.

== Sources ==
- Ramirez, A. Jr., Walther, J. B. Burgoon, J. K., Sunnafrank, M. (2002) Information-seeking strategies, uncertainty, and computer-mediated communication: Toward a conceptual model. Human communication research, vol. 28 213-228
- Stone, A. R. (1995) The war of desire and technology at the close of the mechanical age. Cambridge: MIT Press
- Utz, S., (2010). Show me your friends and I will tell you what type of person you are: How one's profile, number of friends, and type of friends influence impression formation on social network sites. Journal of Computer-Mediated Communication, 15, 314–335
- Walther, J. B. (2011). Theories of computer-mediated communication and interpersonal relations. SAGE Handbook of Interpersonal Communication (4th. ed), 443-479.
