= Jeffrey Pfeffer =

American business theorist

- Born: July 23, 1946 (age 80); St. Louis, Missouri, U.S.

Academic background
- Education: Carnegie-Mellon University; Stanford University
- Thesis: Organizational ecology: a system resource approach (1972)

Jeffrey Pfeffer (born July 23, 1946) is an American business theorist and the Thomas D. Dee II Professor of Organizational Behavior at the Stanford Graduate School of Business.

== Early life ==
Pfeffer graduated high school from the Webb School of California. He received his BS and MS degrees from Carnegie-Mellon University and his PhD from Stanford University. He began his career at the business school at the University of Illinois and then taught at the University of California, Berkeley from 1973 to 1979.

== Career ==
Pfeffer has served on the boards of several human capital management companies including Resumix, Unicru, and Workstream. He also served on the board of publicly traded Sonosite (SONO) for ten years and on the boards of private high-technology companies Actify and Audible Magic. He is currently on the board of directors of the nonprofit, Quantum Leap Healthcare, as well as on the advisory boards of several private companies.

Pfeffer was elected a fellow of the Academy of Management more than 25 years ago, was a fellow at the Center for Advanced Studies in the Behavioral Sciences, won the Richard D. Irwin award for scholarly contributions to management, is in the Thinker's 50 Hall of Fame, and in 2011, was awarded an honorary doctorate from Tilburg University.

Pfeffer formalized the study of resource dependence theory in his text The External Control of Organizations: A Resource Dependence-Perspective, which he co-authored with Jerry Salancik.

Pfeffer has done theoretical and empirical research on the subjects of human resource management, power and politics in organizations, evidence-based management, the knowing-doing gap, leadership, stratification and labor markets inside organizations, the sociology of science, how and why theories become self-fulfilling, the psychological relationship between time and money, and economic evaluation.

Pfeffer has been recognised for writing case studies, and was listed among the top 40 case authors published by The Case Centre in 2016. He was ranked 25th in 2015/16.

=== Elective on power in organizations ===
Pfeffer has taught both elective and core classes in human resource management and the core course in organizational behavior. When he joined the Stanford faculty, he developed an elective on power in organizations. First called Power and Politics in Organizations, some years ago the class was retitled The Paths to Power. The elective has been consistently popular, with Pfeffer teaching two sections per year and, over the years, other colleagues teaching sections as well.

=== Evidence-based management ===
Pfeffer discusses evidence-based management in the Harvard Business Review. This is a form of managing where ideas are presented to managers who in turn ask the team to show them evidence that their ideas work. This keeps managers from making decisions without having the right information to make a decision. This strategy that Pfeffer talks about can help managers learn what works and what does not work.

Pfeiffer writes an online column about twice a month for Fortune.

== Awards and honors ==
- BP Faculty Fellow In Global Management for 2021-22
- Hank McKinnell-Pfizer Inc. Faculty Fellow for 2015-16
- Honorary Doctorate, Tilburg University, The Netherlands, 2011
- Richard D. Irwin Scholarly Contributions to Management Award, Academy of Management, 1989
- Terry Book Award, Academy of Management, 1984

== Publications ==
- 1978. The External Control of Organizations: A Resource Dependence Perspective. with Gerald R. Salancik (Harper & Row)
- 1975. Organizational Design (A H M Publications)
- 1981. Power in Organizations (HarperCollins)
- 1982. Organizations and Organization Theory (HarperCollins)
- 1992. Managing with Power: Politics and Influence in Organizations (Harvard Business School Press)
- 1994. Competitive Advantage Through People: Unleashing the Power of the Work Force (Reed Business Information)
- 1997. New Directions for Organization Theory: Problems and Prospects (Oxford University Press USA)
- 1998. The Human Equation: Building Profits by Putting People First (Harvard Business School Press)
- 2000. The Knowing-Doing Gap: How Smart Companies Turn Knowledge into Action. With Robert I. Sutton (Harvard Business School Press)
- 2000. Hidden Value: How Great Companies Achieve Extraordinary Results with Ordinary People With Charles A. O'Reilly III (Harvard Business School Press)
- 2006. Hard Facts, Dangerous Half-Truths, and Total Nonsense: Profiting from Evidence-Based Management With Robert I. Sutton (Harvard Business School Press)
- 2007. What Were They Thinking: Unconventional Wisdom About Management (Harvard Business School Press)
- 2010. Power: Why Some People Have It and Others Don't (HarperBusiness)
- 2015. Leadership BS: Fixing Workplaces and Careers One Truth at a Time (HarperBusiness).
- 2018. Dying for a Paycheck: How Modern Management Harms Employee Health and Company Performance—and What We Can Do About It (HarperCollins)
- 2022. 7 Rules of Power: Surprising—but True—Advice on How to Get Things Done and Advance Your Career (Penguin Random House).
