= Gerald R. Salancik =

American organizational theorist (1943–1996)

Gerald R. (Jerry) Salancik (29 January 1943 - 24 July 1996) was an American organizational theorist, and Professor at Carnegie Mellon University. He is best known for his work with Jeffrey Pfeffer on "organizational decision making" and "the external control of organizations."

== Life and work ==
Salancik obtained his BS in Journalism in 1965 from the Northwestern University, and obtained his PhD in experimental social psychology in 1971 at Yale University.

After his graduation, Salancik was researcher at the Institute for the Future for a year. In 1972, he was appointed Associate Professor of Organization Behavior at the University of Illinois at Urbana–Champaign. Salancik was eventually appointed the D.B. Kirr Professor of Organization at the Graduate School of Industrial Administration at Carnegie Mellon University.

== Work ==
In the early 1970s, at the Institute for the Future Salancik started his study of "purposeful adjustment of organizations to environmental change [which] led naturally to a concern for power, both within and between organizations." His research interests developed into the "areas of organizational power, commitment, attitude change, and technological forecasting... [and specifically] on strategic planning problems for organizations and on issues of control and change."

Salancik became known for his work with Pfeffer on organizational decision making, and external control of organizations. In their opinion "organizations should be understood in terms of their interdependence with their environments. They advocate a resource dependence perspective. For example, explaining discontent among the employees of a fastfood chain in terms of poor human relations and poor pay is irrelevant if the organization can draw on a pool of easily recruited youthful labor; and because its competitors can do so, too, the organization is not going to incur the costs of better human relations and pay."

== Legacy ==
The Gerald R. Salancik Doctoral Dissertation Award is given each year to a doctoral student in Organizational Behavior & Theory at the Tepper School of Business, Carnegie Mellon University.

== Selected publications ==
- Pfeffer, Jeffrey, and Gerald R. Salancik. The external control of organizations: A resource dependence perspective. Stanford University Press, 1978; 2003.
- Salancik, Gerald R., and Barry M. Staw (eds.) New directions in organizational behavior. Krieger, 1982.

Articles, a selection:

- Pfeffer, Jeffrey, and Gerald R. Salancik. "Organizational decision making as a political process: The case of a university budget." Administrative Science Quarterly (1974): 135-151.
- Salancik, Gerald R., and Jeffrey Pfeffer. "An examination of need-satisfaction models of job attitudes." Administrative science quarterly (1977): 427-456.
- Salancik, Gerald R., and Jeffrey Pfeffer. "A social information processing approach to job attitudes and task design." Administrative science quarterly (1978): 224-253.
- Leblebici, H., Salancik, G. R., Copay, A., & King, T. (1991). "Institutional change and the transformation of interorganizational fields: An organizational history of the US radio broadcasting industry." Administrative science quarterly, 333-363.
