= Behavioral confirmation =

Behavioral confirmation is a type of self-fulfilling prophecy whereby people's social expectations lead them to behave in ways that cause others to confirm their expectations. The phenomenon of belief creating reality is known by several names in literature: self-fulfilling prophecy, expectancy confirmation, and behavioral confirmation, which was coined by social psychologist Mark Snyder in 1984. Snyder preferred this term because it emphasizes that it is the target's actual behavior that confirms the perceiver's beliefs.

== Self-fulfilling prophecy ==
Preconceived beliefs and expectations are used by human beings when they interact with others, as guides to action. Their actions may then guide the interacting partner to behave in a way that confirms the individual's initial beliefs. The self-fulfilling prophecy is essentially the idea that beliefs and expectations can and do create their own reality. Sociologist Robert K. Merton defined a self-fulfilling prophecy as, in the beginning, a false definition of the situation evoking a new behavior which makes the originally false conception come true.

Self-fulfilling prophecy focuses on the behavior of the perceiver in electing expected behavior from the target, whereas behavioral confirmation focuses on the role of the target's behavior in confirming the perceiver's beliefs.

== Research ==
Research has shown that a person (referred to as a perceiver) who possesses beliefs about another person (referred to as a target) will often act on these beliefs in ways that lead the target to actually behave in ways that confirm the perceiver's original beliefs.

In one demonstration of behavioral confirmation in social interaction, Snyder and colleagues had previously unacquainted male and female partners get acquainted through a telephone-like intercom system. The male participants were referred to as the perceivers, and the female participants were referred to as the targets. Prior to their conversations, the experimenter gave the male participants a Polaroid picture and led them to believe that it depicted their female partners. The male participants were unaware that, in fact, the pictures were not of their partners. The experimenter gave the perceivers pictures which portrayed either physically attractive or physically unattractive women in order to activate the perceiver's stereotypes that they may possess concerning attractive and unattractive people. The perceiver-target dyads engaged in a 10-minute, unstructured conversation, which was initiated by the perceivers. Individuals, identified as the raters, listened in on only the targets' contributions to the conversations and rated their impressions of the targets. Results showed that targets whose partners believed them to be physically attractive came to behave in a more sociable, warm, and outgoing manner than targets whose partners believed them to be physically unattractive. Consequently, targets behaviorally confirmed the perceivers' beliefs, thus turning the perceivers' beliefs into self-fulfilling prophecies. The study also supported and displayed the physical attractiveness stereotype.

These findings suggest that human beings, who are the targets of many perceivers in everyday life, may routinely act in ways which are consistent not with their own attitudes, beliefs, or feelings; but rather with the perceptions and stereotypes which others hold of them and their attributes. This seems to suggest that the power of others' beliefs over one's behaviour is extremely strong.

== Mechanisms ==
Snyder proposed a four-step sequence in which behavioral confirmation occurs:

1. The perceiver adopts beliefs about the target
2. The perceiver acts as if these beliefs were true and treats the target accordingly
3. The target assimilates his or her behavior to the perceiver's overtures
4. The perceiver interprets the target's behavior as confirmation of his or her original beliefs.

== Motivational foundations ==
The perceiver and the target have a common goal of getting acquainted with one other, and they do so in different functions. Behavioral confirmation occurs from the combination of a perceiver who is acting in the service of the knowledge function and a target whose behaviors serve an adjustive function.

The perceiver uses knowledge motivations in order to get a stable and predictable view of those whom one interacts, eliciting behavioral confirmation. Perceivers use knowledge-oriented strategies, which occur when perceivers view their interactions with targets as opportunities to find out about their targets' personality and to check their impressions of targets, leading perceivers to ask belief-confirming questions. The perceiver asks the target questions in order to form stable and predictable impressions of their partner, and perceivers tend to confidently assume that possession of even the limited information gathered about the other person gives them the ability to predict that that person's future will be consistent with the impressions gathered.

When the target is motivated by adjustive functions, they are motivated to try to get along with their partners and to have a smooth and pleasant conversation with the perceiver. The adjustive function motivates the targets to reciprocate perceivers' overtures and thereby to behaviorally confirm perceivers' erroneous beliefs. Without the adjustive function, this may lead to behavioral disconfirmation.

== Examples ==
- Physical attractiveness – When one interacts with another person of high or low physical attractiveness, they influence that person's social prowess. When a target (unbeknownst to themselves) is tagged physically attractive, that target, through interaction with the perceiver, in turn comes to behave in a friendlier manner than do those tagged unattractive.
- Race – In a 1997 study by Chen and Bargh, it was shown that participants who were subliminally primed with an African-American stereotype observed more hostility from the target they interacted with than those who were in the control condition. This study suggests that behavioral confirmation caused targets to become more hostile when their perceiver had been negatively primed.
- Gender – When participants were made aware of their targets' gender in a division of labour task, targets fell into their gender-specific roles through behavioral confirmation.
- Loneliness – Adults who were presented with a hypothetically lonely peer and a non-lonely hypothetical peer were found to report greater rejection of the lonely peer, with evidence that this was due to individuals stigmatizing loneliness as a discredited attribute.

== Critique ==
The principle objection to the idea of behavioral confirmation is that the laboratory situations that are used in the research often do not map onto real-world social interaction easily. In addition, it is argued that behavioral disconfirmation is just as likely to develop out of expectancies as are self-fulfilling expectations. A strong criticism by Lee Jussim is the allegation that, in all previous behavioral confirmation studies, the participants have been falsely misled about the targets' characteristics; however, in real life, people's expectations are generally correct. To combat such critique, behavioral confirmation has adapted to introduce a non-conscious element. Even though there are clearly pitfalls to the phenomenon, it has continuously been studied over the past few decades, highlighting its importance in psychology.
