= Computer-mediated communication =

Human communication that occurs through the use of two or more electronic devices

Computer-mediated communication (CMC) is human communication that occurs through the use of two or more electronic devices. Computer-mediated communication is relevant to linguistics as it shows how digital environments influence grammar and pragmatic meaning. While the term has traditionally referred to those communications that occur via computer-mediated formats (e.g., instant messaging, email, chat rooms, online forums, social network services), it has also been applied to other forms of text-based interaction such as text messaging. Research on CMC focuses largely on the social effects of different computer-supported communication technologies. Many recent studies involve Internet-based social networking supported by social software.

Computer-Mediated Communication

== Forms ==
Computer-mediated communication can be broken down into two forms: synchronous and asynchronous. Synchronous computer-mediated communication refers to communication that occurs in real-time. All parties are engaged in the communication simultaneously; however, they are not necessarily all in the same location. Examples of synchronous communication are video chats and audio calls. On the other hand, asynchronous computer-mediated communication refers to communication that takes place when the parties engaged are not communicating in unison. In other words, the sender does not receive an immediate response from the receiver. Most forms of computer-mediated technology are asynchronous. Examples of asynchronous communication are text messages and emails.

== Scope ==
Example of emoticon use, a paralinguistic aspect of computer-mediated communication.

Scholars from a variety of fields study phenomena that can be described under the umbrella term of computer-mediated communication (CMC) (see also Internet studies). For example, many take a sociopsychological approach to CMC by examining how humans use "computers" (or digital media) to manage interpersonal interaction, form impressions and maintain relationships. These studies have often focused on the differences between online and offline interactions, though contemporary research is moving towards the view that CMC should be studied as embedded in everyday life. Another branch of CMC research examines the use of paralinguistic features such as emoticons, pragmatic rules such as turn-taking and the sequential analysis and organization of talk, and the various sociolects, styles, registers or sets of terminology specific to these environments (see Leet). The study of language in these contexts is typically based on text-based forms of CMC, and is sometimes referred to as "computer-mediated discourse analysis". In linguistics, CMC is used to examine digital discussions and features like emojis.

The way humans communicate in professional, social, and educational settings varies widely, depending upon not only the environment but also the method of communication in which the communication occurs, which in this case is through computers or other information and communication technologies (ICTs). The study of communication to achieve collaboration—common work products—is termed computer-supported collaboration and includes only some of the concerns of other forms of CMC research.

Popular forms of CMC include e-mail, video, audio or text chat (text conferencing including "instant messaging"), bulletin board systems, list-servs, and MMOs. These settings are changing rapidly with the development of new technologies. Weblogs (blogs) have also become popular, and the exchange of RSS data has better enabled users to each "become their own publisher".

== Characteristics ==
Communication occurring within a computer-mediated format has an effect on many different aspects of an interaction. Some of those that have received attention in the scholarly literature include impression formation, deception, group dynamics, disclosure reciprocity, disinhibition and especially relationship formation.

CMC is examined and compared to other communication media through a number of aspects thought to be universal to all forms of communication, including (but not limited to) synchronicity, persistence or "recordability", and anonymity. The association of these aspects with different forms of communication varies widely. For example, instant messaging is intrinsically synchronous but not persistent, since one loses all the content when one closes the dialog box unless one has a message log set up or has manually copy-pasted the conversation. E-mail and message boards, on the other hand, are low in synchronicity since response time varies, but high in persistence since messages sent and received are saved. Properties that separate CMC from other media also include transience, its multimodal nature, and its relative lack of governing codes of conduct. CMC is able to overcome physical and social limitations of other forms of communication and therefore allow the interaction of people who are not physically sharing the same space.

Technology would be a powerful tool when defining communication as a learning process that needs a sender and receiver. According to Nicholas Jankowski in his book The Contours of Multimedia, a third party, like software, acts in the middle between a sender and receiver. The sender is interacting with this third party to send. The receiver interacts with it as well, creating an additional interaction with the medium itself along with the initially intended one between sender and receiver.

The medium in which people choose to communicate influences the extent to which people disclose personal information. CMC is marked by higher levels of self-disclosure in conversation as opposed to face-to-face interactions. Self disclosure is any verbal communication of personally relevant information, thought, and feeling which establishes and maintains interpersonal relationships. This is due in part to visual anonymity and the absence of nonverbal cues which reduce concern for losing positive face. According to Walther’s (1996) hyperpersonal communication model, computer-mediated communication is valuable in providing a better communication and better first impressions. Moreover, Ramirez and Zhang (2007) indicate that computer-mediated communication allows more closeness and attraction between two individuals than a face-to-face communication. Online impression management, self-disclosure, attentiveness, expressivity, composure and other skills contribute to competence in computer mediated communication. In fact, there is a considerable correspondence of skills in computer-mediated and face-to-face interaction even though there is great diversity of online communication tools.

Anonymity and in part privacy and security depends more on the context and particular program being used or web page being visited. However, most researchers in the field acknowledge the importance of considering the psychological and social implications of these factors alongside the technical "limitations".

== Language learning ==
CMC is widely discussed in language learning because CMC provides opportunities for language learners to practice their language. For example, Warschauer conducted several case studies on using email or discussion boards in different language classes. Warschauer claimed that information and communications technology “bridge the historic divide between speech...and writing”. Thus, considerable concern has arisen over the reading and writing research in L2 due to the booming of the Internet. In the learning process, students, especially kids, need cognitive learning, but they also need social interaction, which enhances their psychological needs. Although technology has its powerful effect in assisting the English language learners to learn, it can not be a comprehensive way that covers different aspects of the learning process.

== Benefits ==
The nature of CMC means that it is easy for individuals to engage in communication with others regardless of time, location, or other spatial constraints to communication. Because CMC allows for individuals to collaborate on projects that would otherwise be impossible due to such factors as geography, it has enhanced social interaction not only between individuals but also in working life. In addition, CMC can also be useful for allowing individuals who might be intimidated due to factors like character or disabilities to participate in communication. By allowing an individual to communicate in a location of their choosing, a CMC call allows a person to engage in communication with minimal stress. Making an individual comfortable through CMC also plays a role in self-disclosure, which allows a communicative partner to open up more easily and be more expressive. When communicating through an electronic medium, individuals are less likely to engage in stereotyping and are less self-conscious about physical characteristics. The role that anonymity plays in online communication can also encourage some users to be less defensive and form relationships with others more rapidly.

== Disadvantages ==
While computer-mediated communication can be beneficial, technological mediation can also inhibit the communication process. Unlike face-to-face communication, nonverbal cues such as tone and physical gestures, which assist in conveying the message, are lost through computer-mediated communication. As a result, the message being communicated is more vulnerable to being misunderstood due to a wrong interpretation of tone or word meaning. Moreover, according to Dr. Sobel-Lojeski of Stony Brook University and Professor Westwell of Flinders University, the virtual distance that is fundamental to computer-mediated communication can create a psychological and emotional sense of detachment, which can contribute to sentiments of societal isolation.

== Linguistics and digital communication ==
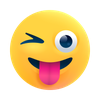
Emojis are a form of Computer-Mediated Communication

Computer-mediated communication (CMC) is an important topic within Internet Linguistics, which studies how language adapts to online platforms. These studies help contribute to discussions of language change in digital language contexts. Linguists study CMC to understand how platform architecture affects linguistic behavior. Scholars also examine the use of paralinguistic features like emojis and hashtags. These features may have different interpretations across cultures and speech communities. CMC gives insight into language variation. Linguistic forms that emerge in computer mediated contexts can contribute to the process of language change.

== Crime ==
Cybersex trafficking and other cyber crimes involve computer-mediated communication. Cybercriminals can carry out the crimes in any location where they have a computer or tablet with a webcam or a smartphone with an internet connection. They also rely on social media networks, videoconferences, pornographic video sharing websites, dating pages, online chat rooms, apps, dark web sites, and other platforms. They use online payment systems and cryptocurrencies to hide their identities. Millions of reports of these crimes are sent to authorities annually. New laws and police procedures are needed to combat crimes involving CMC.

== See also ==
- Emotions in virtual communication
- Internet relationship
- Discourse community
