= Channel expansion theory =

Theory of communication media perceptions

Channel expansion theory (CET) states that individual experience serves as an important role in determining the level of richness perception and development towards certain media tools. It is a theory of communication media perception that incorporates experiential factors to explain and predict user perceptions of a given media channel. The theory suggests that the more knowledge and experience users gain from using a channel, the richer they perceive the medium to be. The more experience, the more stable the knowledge base the person builds, the more knowledge he gains from the given media channel, thus the richer communication he would have using that channel, and ultimately the richer he would perceive the channel. There are four experiential factors that shapes individual's perceived media richness: experience with the channel, experience with the message topic, experience with the organizational context, and experience with a communication partner.

Channel expansion theory was developed by John. R. Carlson and Robert W. Zmud in 1999.

== Background ==
Channel expansion theory builds from a variety of theoretical perspectives that address perceptions of media channels.

It is developed from media richness theory as studies tested directly using media richness theory have turned out to have confusing results such as e-mail. Media richness varies, according to multiplicity of cues and immediacy of feedback. As Daft and Lengel suggest, face-to-face communication is the best medium for equivocal, or complex, communication between two people, whereas less-rich mediums can be effective so long as the complexity of the information being transferred from one party to the other does not exceed the channel's capacity. Channel expansion theory moves away from Daft and Lengel's fixed labeling of rich and lean media. While media richness theory suggests that a given media has a fixed richness determined by its characteristics, channel expansion theory suggests the opposite. It introduces perceived media richness as a new concept, and states that media richness perception is dynamic. As long as individuals overcome the restrictions of the moderators, they will be able to generate richer perception toward the given media channel.

Channel expansion theory also incorporates the social influence model. As Matt Germonprez argues, media richness fails to realize that social and cognitive have influence. Nevertheless, channel expansion theory is socially constructed, greatly impacted by the effect of communication partner. It suggests that group member's media perceptions and use align with those of the rest of the group members. From the critical perspective, channel expansion theory is determined through validity claims which then result in a resolution in communication breakdowns. The critical approach emphasizes the role of context in shaping individual's view toward a certain media channel: technology, organizational context, individual are all factors. From the critical social theory perspective, channel expansion needs to be measured through three time zones. Channel expansion increases between phase 1 and 2, but reduces between phase 2 and 3.

To expand on this position, the technology acceptance model (TAM), a theory of the Information system provides a detailed explanation of users' choice in adopting a Technology. Venkatesh, Davis argue that users adopt technology when they perceive it as useful and within their range of acceptance, which can be voluntary or mandated depending on context.

Channel expansion theory is also connected with Media naturalness theory by Ned Kockwhich attempts to apply Darwinian evolutionary principles to suggest which types of computer-mediated communication will best fit innate human communication capabilities. Media naturalness theory argues that natural selection has resulted in face-to-face communication becoming the most effective way for two people to exchange information. According to media naturalness theory, for example, students learning about school subjects online should perform more poorly in tests covering those subjects than students learning about the same subjects face-to-face. However, Carlson and Zmud, predicted that users of unnatural media will adapt to those media in a compensatory way, and thus developed a theory of channel expansion. Essentially, channel expansion theory suggests that perceptions of communication channel are likely to vary across users and explains the variation by incorporating one particularly important factor that has not been considered prior – media use experience. By acquiring knowledge-building experiences in four domains (channel, topic, partner, organizational context) identified in the theory, users will have increased ability to communicate effectively in various situational contexts and will thus perceive the channel as being richer. Carlson and Zmud conceptualized relevant experience in channel expansion is not just the length of time of channel use, but also the nature of that use and the bases of knowledge developed through it.

Consistent with the channel expansion theory, Lisiecka et al. conclude in a 2016 study that people will inherently adjust their messages to better fit with a selected communication medium. Their study was directed toward task-related communication between dyads (couples) who interacted through one of face-to-face conversations, via voice calls, or textually. The authors point out that, although it has been generally accepted that “media other than face-to-face are considered an obstacle rather than an equally effective means of information transfer” (2016, p. 13), their results suggest that computer-mediated communication “has become similarly natural and intuitive as face-to-face contacts” (2016, p. 13).

=== Example ===
Sara and Bill are two employees working in the same company. They both use electronic mail (Email) as the major way of communication inside the company. Sara has worked in the company for multiple years and therefore has become very familiar with email use within the company and has built up a social interaction network with other colleagues. Bill, on the contrary, is new to the company. He has little experience contacting and doing business via email and has little acquaintances and networks inside the company. According to channel expansion theory, it is predictable that Sara would have richer understanding of the capability and potential of email communication, whereas Bill would perceive it in a leaner manner.

== Application ==
=== Organizational ===
Channel expansion theory has proved to be useful in the field of organizational communication. It supports the education to new recruits about the three most important qualities in organizations: communication skill, problem-solving ability, and teamwork. Early conceptual use of organizational media focused on media characteristics as primary determinants of 'users’ communication experience. For organizational managers, the theory demonstrates that communication effectiveness and choice of communication media is bounded by user's communication experiences, thus in order for the organizational employees to become proficient on a given communication channel and in a given organizational context, they must go through learning process to maximize the media communication richness potential. Additionally, the theory is associated with the level of the communicator's ability to appropriate the medium to achieve shared understanding with communication partner; as perception of media richness improves with the acquired experience it has a positive effect on use richness – how much users employ various features of a communication channel. Individual's perception of channel richness kept vary over time. As individual users vary in how they utilize different features of media channels in their communication processes there is also a need for some form of training to continuously support users as technical features and communication capabilities of the channel expand (channel becomes richer).

Channel expansion theory offers support for the relationship between perceived media richness and level of self regulation existing among corporate managers and employees. When the message sender is in a promotional state, he tends to perceive the media channel as richer. Contrarily, when the message sender is in a prevention state, he tends to have lower level of perceived media richness and focus on the intrinsic qualities of the media channel. While prior literature concludes that two managers in the same company with similar experience would have similar level of perceived media richness, it has been proved to be wrong. A content whose significance does not fit into the perceived richness of the employee can easily cause misunderstanding and cause a decrease in communication effectiveness. Channel expansion theory suggests that message sender should think about having a receiver who has self-regulatory focus before actually sending the message.

=== Educational ===
==== Cloud-based Virtual Learning Environment ====
Besides organizational communication, research have also been done in the field of education. With the advancing cloud computing technology, virtual learning environment(VLE) is becoming more and more popular. Virtual learning environment denies the limitations of location and time by enabling access to information anytime, anywhere as long as educational resources are saved in the cloud. Channel expansion theory can be applied to cloud-based virtual learning environment. In a case study conducted by Malaysian-based scholars, results showed a positive correlation of media richness and 'intention' to use C-VLE, as an effective behavioral motivator for success. Perceived media richness is shown as positively related to behavioral intention and VLE (virtual learning environment) interactivity while being directly influenced by VLE content design. The study shows that teachers' richness perception toward VLE depends on its content design. Therefore, content should be designed to meet teachers’ needs. The richer the teachers think VLE is, the more they are motivated to use it in actual teaching in classrooms and interact with the VLE system. This advances from VLE content design on behavioral intention in terms of digital libraries and perceived media richness on VLE interactivity in terms of online forums.

==== College-level education ====
In a study conducted on a group of undergraduate students examining their midterm grades and final grades throughout a single semester in an introductory management information system course, half of the students took the course in a face-to-face teaching while the other half took it online. At first students in face-to-face class performed better and have grades much higher in midterm than students who did it online. Later in finals, this difference is minimal. Channel expansion theory is applied in this context as ultimately there is no difference in media conditions of learning when students conducting online studies managed to get familiar with the technology. Similar results has also shown in another study conducted by Anne Hoag, Krishna Jayakar and K K Erickson in a telecommunication course, trying to find out how communication technology facilitate team learning. The study shows that there is no real difference between instruction media. Rather, it is the teaching that actually matters.

In another study conducted by Alperen Manisaligil and Diana Bilimoria, researchers examined videos and open letters between NBA athlete LeBron James and Cleveland Cavaliers majority owner Dan Gilbert, channel expansion theory is proved to be helpful in terms of improving students' skills of media selection and reinforcement of effective communication. The theory can be applied into a wide range of classes: organizational behavior, introduction to business and management, leadership, human resources management, introduction to public relations, and crisis management.

=== Medical ===
Channel expansion theory offers supports for effective communication between doctors and patients with chronic disease. Chronic disease usually happens to people in their older ages. This is a time period that many have lost their chances to engage with certain media channels. As the study shows, patients aging from 65 to 80 years old usually have no communication portal set up because they have difficulties engaging with technology. Patients aging from 50 to 64 years old tend to choose media channels they are familiar with. Therefore, applying CET into this field can help doctors to choose the most suitable communication tool. Together with media synchronicity theory, they provide better service and care.

== Criticism ==
Channel expansion theory has been criticized for being originally applied to a single medium - email - and not having tested whether it operates similarly for more traditional media (like telephone) or advanced technologies (like videoconferencing). Another shortcoming of the theory noted in literature is that the developers of the theory (Carlson and Zmud) did not examine whether different forms of knowledge obtained through relevant experiences they identified may be impacting different richness dimensions. Finally, the theory overlooks the constraints that channels' inherent technological features may pose on the ability and degree to which media richness can "expand", even if knowledge-building experiences might enhance media perceived richness, the media can still be objectively perceived as richer because of its capability constraints (like lack of video/audio, sensory etc.).

== See also ==
- Communication theory
- Media naturalness theory
- Media richness theory
- Social influence
- Critical mass (sociodynamics)
- Technology acceptance model
- Organizational information theory
- Social information processing (theory)
- Social presence theory
- Call to action (marketing)
- Communicative action
- Grounded theory
