= Multi-communicating =

Act of managing many conversations at once

Multi-communicating is the act of managing multiple conversations simultaneously. The term was coined by Reinsch, Turner, and Tinsley, who proposed that simultaneous conversations can be conducted using an array of media, including face-to-face, phone, and email tools for communication. The practice allows individuals to utilize two or more technologies to interact with each other.

Multi-communicating has evolved with the rapid development of information and communications technology (ICT), where behavior within digital media applications like Slack and Skype thrive. With the emergence of portable devices like laptops, people can use multi-communication tools during meetings and non-meeting activities.

Currently, most academic research focuses on its professional implications, outlining several key factors that shape the act of multi-communicating; the flexibility of communication tempo, the compartmentalization of conversations, topics discussed, and the intensity of interactions contribute to a person's choice to engage in multi-communication, as well as their ultimate success with the practice. Many people engage in multiple conversations as a direct response to the requests of others. Employees frequently believe that multi-communication increases their productivity and work efficiency, but in-depth interviews about the practice of multi-communication have often revealed mixed results. Research has also shown that the most common combinations used for multi-communicating are the telephone and email, followed by text-based messaging (text messaging, instant messaging, etc.).

== Multi-communicating and multitasking ==
Multi-communicating is similar in nature to multitasking. Differentiating between multi-communication and media multitasking can be difficult, as both of the terms concern the participation of people in two or more events at the same time. Multitasking refers to the behavior of performing two or more unrelated tasks concurrently, simply emphasizing task independence and performance concurrency, while multi-communication involves individuals participating in more than one simultaneous conversations, which not only requires adequate attention to both tasks, but also coordination between each task. The timing and the pace of communication are also, at least partially, controlled by others and must mediate between different times of exchanges. As such, multi-communication can be considered a complex form of multitasking.

In addition to multi-communication, multitasking also includes electronic multitasking, which entails consuming one-way media while actively performing another activity, such as watching television while doing homework; invisible whispering, where individuals secretively use media to communicate with others during a meeting, such as texting a person within the same conference room; and social multitasking, which involves tasks that are primarily social-interactive, such as switching between face-to-face conversation and texting.

== Foundational theories ==
Multi-communication primarily builds off Edward T. Hall's work on polychronicity, Erving Goffman's presentation of self, and Richard L. Daft and Robert H. Lengel's theory of media richness.The practice also bears relevance to media ecology and channel expansion theory.

=== Polychronicity (Hall) ===
Turner and Reinsch, who coined the term multi-communicating in 2008, initially introduced the term polychronic communication in one of their first presentations to the wider academic community.

=== Media richness theory (Daft and Lengel) ===
Another concept in multi-communication is Daft and Lengel's research on media richness theory, which concerns how employees choose which technologies to use in the workplace.

In their study on the relationship between managerial communication and media selection, Daft and Lengel encourage communication media that emphasizes face-to-face interaction.

Multi-communicating takes the medium selection concept from media richness theory and suggests that some of the same characteristics that contribute to making medium choices may also contribute to the reasons a person might multi-communicate. For example, if a conversation is not very complicated or equivocal, a person might be more likely to engage in multiple conversations. A conversation that is more complicated might make it hard for multi-communication to take place.

=== Media ecology theory ===
Organizational norms shape the frequency and usage of multi-communication within an organization. In this sense, the practice of multi-communicating is a type of multimedia practice, as people often use more than one media when engaging in multiple conversations.

Media ecology theory centers on the principles that there is a strong connection between media, technology and communication, and how media and communication processes influence human perception, feeling, understanding and value; usually all three are used when engaged in multiple conversations in a technology-enriched workplace.

== Characteristics and factors ==
=== Characteristics ===
Research suggests that there are two characteristics that help to determine a person's choice of communication media when engaging in multi-communicating: compartmentalization and flexibility of tempo.

==== Compartmentalization ====
Compartmentalization refers to the ability to perform and ease of cross-conversations. For instance, an online chat allows one to move relatively freely from one conversation to another. Cameron and Webster mention that "a medium with invisibility does not allow visual cues to be exchanged during the interaction, and using two media with invisibility makes it easier to compartmentalize the conversation while multi-communicating". In this case, the ability to hide conversations from multiple communication partners is also important factor of compartmentalization.

==== Flexibility of tempo ====
Flexibility of tempo refers to the amount of time a person has to respond to a certain message. Face-to-face communication often allows for less flexibility of tempo than does a text message. Most typically, users choose to combine media technologies such as the telephone (described as non-flexible in tempo and partially compartmentalized) with those such as electronic text (described as high in both flexibility and compartmentalization capabilities). Sometimes presence allocators do not have a choice about one or more of the media they engage with, but specific combinations of communication media may contribute strongly toward the success or, lack thereof, one has with multi-communicating.

=== Outcome factors ===
Several factors may help to determine the outcomes of an episode of multi-communicating, including intensity, the topic of conversation, equivocality, and the presence allocator.

==== Intensity of communication ====
The intensity of communication is one of the key factors in multi-communicating because it helps to predict the amount of attention and importance a specific conversation holds. Typically, conversation intensity increases with more, simultaneous conversations, a faster pace of conversion, a broader range of topics, and a wider mix of social roles. Social roles are based on the position an individual holds in a conversation, such as a supervisor communicating with a subordinate. Overly high intensity has sometimes been reported as a factor for unsuccessful multi-communicating.

==== Topic of conversation ====
The more similar the themes of the simultaneous conversations are, the easier it is for the presence allocator to process information and engage in conversation-switching. Similarly, the more divergent the topics or themes of conversation, the bigger the cognitive strain on the presence allocator and the higher the chance for confusion.

==== Equivocality ====
Equivocality refers to the possibility for multiple interpretations of an issue. These multiple interpretations can lead to disagreements regarding an issue. Reinsch and Turner's study suggests that the higher the potential for equivocality in a conversation, the more likely an individual is to pick a medium of communication that is rich in contextual cues or has high media-richness.

==== Presence allocator ====
Presence allocators will divide their presence among multiple interactions. The physiological and cognitive perspectives are presented in presence allocators, which typically show how people are able to think faster than they are able to speak or type. Most neuroscientific studies imply that people are not truly cognitively capable of multitasking, but only able to switch between tasks. This means that those who are most skilled at apparent multitasking, or multi-communicating, are essentially very quick at juggling their attention between messages.

There are limits to an individual's working memory that restricts cognitive information processing capabilities. Performance deteriorates when these limits are exceeded. Because of these limits, performing two tasks at the same time or rapidly switching between two tasks results in decreased task performance in terms of accuracy and response time. These problems can be partially alleviated (but not eliminated) by practice.

Research suggests that presence allocators have the most successful experiences with multi-communicating episodes when engaged in multiple conversations with contextually appropriate media around similar topics.

== Implications ==
Studies on multi-communicating began when instant messaging became common practice.

=== Productivity ===
Most people indicate that they multi-communicate in order to be more efficient. Barber and de Bruin suggest that "electronic multitasking can be considered a citizenship behavior when there are benefits to using technology in the workplace". They further explain that electronic multitasking can be efficient when multi-communication is task-relevant. However, this goal of efficiency has received some mixed results. Despite the notion that completing multiple tasks simultaneously promotes productivity to communication and multiple conversations, many people reveal a breaking point at which they can no longer juggle synchronous messages. Significant numbers of research subjects also indicate that they prefer to stay away from multi-communicating altogether when it comes to important conversations that require strong attention.

Several scholars hypothesized that increased workload can influence people engaging in multi-communicating. Since a heavy workload gives people a sense of loss of time, this may result in people compensating by multi-communicating. However, perceived communication overload did not predict meeting multitasking behaviors.

=== Perceived incivility ===
Cameron and Webster examined the relational outcomes of multi-communicating from the following aspects: conversation leveraging, multi-communicating performance, focal individual accessibility, partner's polychronic communication orientation, awareness, and media fit. In their research, a multi-communicator's secrecy in regards to what they are and who they are conversing with led to higher perceptions of incivility.

== Practical uses ==
=== Personal interaction ===
Staying connected has become a norm and a habit pervasive at the societal level, especially with the development of new information and communications technologies (ICTs).

Bayer, Campbell, & Ling described how individuals internalize and enable social connectedness within their daily lives. The model outlines: types of connection cues; factors that moderate sensitivity to connection norms; and activation paths for connection habits.

Turner & Foss developed their "attentional social presence theory," which suggests that there are four types of presences when one engages in multiple conversations, each involving the control of one's audience and technology, the choices they make, and how they interact:

- Budgeted presence occurs when someone engages in multiple conversations at once, such as talking to one's friend while sending an email.
- Entitled presence occurs when someone can take an individual takes another's technology away or vice versa.
- Competitive presence occurs when someone tries to persuade other people or group of people to pay attention to them, and one has to compete with their communication technology.
- Invitational presence occurs when someone decide to focus on one's audience and someone is making a concrete effort to be in the moment (only one conversation), someone is focused only on that interaction.

In attempts to determine whether social presence can be measured, Biocca, Harms & Burgoon emphasize the need for understanding social behavior in mediated environments. They argue that such environments allow researchers to predict and measure differences among interfaces and guide the design of new social environments and interfaces.

=== Group interactions ===
Multi-communicating is especially present in team collaborations. In order to be more effective in their workplace, teams use different platforms for their communication practices. There are a number of communication platforms, such as Slack, that include multiple social media channels (social networking platforms and instant messaging). The media capabilities of these platforms, including integration for diverse ICTs, enable affordances for both highly adaptable and centralized team communication practices. A recent study shows that team-communication platforms enable affordances for multi-communication and attention allocation, including flexible scaling of media modality and synchronicity.

In organizational settings, research suggests that the decision by individuals to use informational technologies is influenced by what they observe other members in the organization doing, which is positively correlated to their multi-communicational behaviors.

The perception of what others think about multi-communicating is also a significant predictor on this behavior. Due to an underlying perception of rudeness or partiality of conversational investment associated with multi-communicating, people will often hide their multi-communication from their conversational partners. However, when people perceive multi-communicating as acceptable within their organizations, they are less likely to feel embarrassed and will engage in such behaviors more often.

Likewise, depending on the organizational culture, multi-communicating can become crucial and bear negative effects in a professional or office setting. Conversely, research suggests that employees who follow organizational communication norms receive higher performance ratings than those who do not. Therefore, if multi-communicating were considered an organizational norm, its practice could also bring positive feedback.

==== Productivity ====
Multi-communication can change the ways in which teams work and interact within the organization.

Stephens and Davis discuss the social influences on electronic multitasking in organizational meetings. ICTs have infiltrated meetings and allowed for a new range of communicative behaviors to emerge. The perception of what others think of the use of ICTs for multitasking, explain why individuals use or do not use CTs to communicate electronically in meetings. Cardon and Dai (2014) examine the nature of mobile phone use in meetings among Chinese professionals.

Relating to this point, Belanger and Watson made a study exploring how virtual team members structure their use of multiple media to attain strategic goals.

== Criticisms ==
Criticisms of multi-communication theory at large are not prevalent, considering that it is a relatively newly defined and studied behavior. However, as multi-communicating has been largely studied for its professional implications, recent critical research suggests that multi-communicating behavior may have adverse effects on individual productivity, workplace relationships, and stress management.

=== Psychology ===
Cameron (2016) draws from several disciplines, including management and cognitive and social psychology, to provide several misconceptions about multi-communication. After conducting empirical research, she claims that multi-communicating, contrary to popular belief, may render an individual less accessible, less productive, and potentially more rude in certain professional contexts. She points out that multi-communicating behavior, especially among those with a weak ability to focus, has often increased errors, reduced contribution between ongoing conversations, and increased confusion in the workplace. In doing so, many people multi-communicate as an uncontrolled habit rather than a strategic form of communication, offering more negative implications than positive. Cameron, does not advocate against multi-communication, but rather for people to better understand their multi-communicating behaviors and to practice multi-communicating more intentionally.

=== Gender ===
The practical implications of multi-communicating have drawn criticism in gender studies. Paskewitz and Beck conducted research about texting during workplace meetings, and determined that women perceive individuals who practice multi-communicating more negatively than men. At the same time, the gender of the multi-communicator did not play a role in these perceptions.

== See also ==
- Attention management
- Impression management
- Simultaneous communication
- Time management
