= Media richness theory =

Framework describing a communication medium

Media richness theory (MRT), sometimes referred to as information richness theory, is a framework used to describe a communication medium's ability to reproduce the information sent over it. It was introduced by Richard L. Daft and Robert H. Lengel in 1986 as an extension of information processing theory. MRT is used to rank and evaluate the richness of certain communication media, such as phone calls, video conferencing, and email. For example, a phone call cannot reproduce visual social cues such as gestures which makes it a less rich communication media than video conferencing, which affords the transmission of gestures and body language. Based on contingency theory and information processing theory, MRT theorizes that richer, personal communication media are generally more effective for communicating equivocal issues in contrast with leaner, less rich media.

== Background ==
Media richness theory was introduced in 1986 by Richard L. Daft and Robert H. Lengel. Leaning on information processing theory for its theoretical foundation, MRT was originally developed to describe and evaluate communication media within organizations. In presenting media richness theory, Daft and Lengel sought to help organizations cope with communication challenges, such as unclear or confusing messages, or conflicting interpretations of messages.

Other communication scholars have tested the theory in order to improve it, and more recently Media Richness Theory has been retroactively adapted to include new media communication media, such as video telephony, online conferencing, and online coursework. Although media richness theory relates to media use, rather than media choice, empirical studies of the theory have often studied what medium a manager would choose to communicate over, and not the effects of media use (media-adequacy).

Since its introduction, media richness theory has been applied to contexts outside of organizational and business communication (See "Application" section).

== Theory ==
Information richness is defined by Daft and Lengel as "the ability of information to change understanding within a time interval".

Media richness theory states that all communication media vary in their ability to enable users to communicate and to change understanding. The degree of this ability is known as a medium's "richness." MRT places all communication media on a continuous scale based on their ability to adequately communicate a complex message. Media that can efficiently overcome different frames of reference and clarify ambiguous issues are considered to be richer whereas communications media that require more time to convey understanding are deemed less rich.

A primary driver in selecting a communication medium for a particular message is to reduce the equivocality, or possible misinterpretations, of a message. If a message is equivocal, it is unclear and thus more difficult for the receiver to decode. The more equivocal a message, the more cues and data needed to interpret it correctly. For example, a simple message intended to arrange a meeting time and place could be communicated in a short email, but a more detailed message about a person's work performance and expectations would be better communicated through face-to-face interaction.

The theory includes a framework with axes going from low to high equivocality and low to high uncertainty. Low equivocality and low uncertainty represents a clear, well-defined situation; high equivocality and high uncertainty indicates ambiguous events that need clarification by managers. Daft and Lengel also stress that message clarity may be compromised when multiple departments are communicating with each other, as departments may be trained in different skill sets or have conflicting communication norms.

=== Determining media richness ===
In their 1988 article regarding media richness theory, Daft and Lengel state, "The more learning that can be pumped through a medium, the richer the medium." Media richness is a function of characteristics including the following:

- Ability to handle multiple information cues simultaneously
- Ability to facilitate rapid feedback
- Ability to establish a personal focus
- Ability to utilize natural language

=== Selecting an appropriate medium ===
Media richness theory predicts that managers will choose the mode of communication based on aligning the equivocality of the message to the richness of the medium. In other words, communication channels will be selected based on how communicative they are. However, often other factors, such as the resources available to the communicator, come into play. Daft and Lengel's prediction assumes that managers are most concentrated on task efficiency (that is, achieving the communicative goal as efficiently as possible) and does not take into consideration other factors, such as relationship growth and maintenance. Subsequent researchers have pointed out that attitudes towards a medium may not accurately predict a person's likelihood of using that medium over others, as media usage is not always voluntary. If an organization's norms and resources support one medium, it may be difficult for a manager to choose another form to communicate his or her message.

Social presence refers to the degree to which a medium permits communicators to experience others as being psychologically present or the degree to which a medium is perceived to convey the actual presence of the communicating participants. Tasks that involve interpersonal skills, such as resolving disagreements or negotiation, demand high social presence, whereas tasks such as exchanging routine information require less social presence. Therefore, face-to-face media like group meetings are more appropriate for performing tasks that require high social presence; media such as email and written letters are more appropriate for tasks that require low social presence.

Another model that is related to media richness theory as an alternative, particularly in selecting an appropriate medium, is the social influence model. How we perceive media, in this case to decide where a medium falls on the richness scale, depends on "perceptions of media characteristics that are socially created," reflecting social forces and social norms at play in the current environment and the context that determines the needed use. Each organization is different in the goal that is trying to be reached and the missions that are trying to be completed. Thus, with different organizational cultures and environments, the way each organization perceives a medium is different and as a result, the way each organization uses media and deems media as more or less rich will vary.

Communicators also consider how personal a message is when determining the appropriate media for communication. In general, richer media are more personal as they include nonverbal and verbal cues, body language, inflection, and gestures that signal a person's reaction to a message. Rich media can promote a closer relationship between a manager and subordinate. The sentiment of the message may also have an influence on the medium chosen. Managers may want to communicate negative messages in person or via a richer media, even if the equivocality of the message is not high, in order to facilitate better relationships with subordinates. On the other hand, sending a negative message over a leaner medium would weaken the immediate blame on the message sender and prevent them from observing the reaction of the receiver.

As current business models change, allowing more employees to work outside the office, organizations must rethink the reliance on face-to-face communication. Furthermore, the fear of more lean channels must be rid of. In this current context, managers must decide through trial and errors which medium is best used for various situations, namely an employee that works from the office vs. an employee that works outside the office. Business is being conducted on a global scale. In order to save money and cut back on travel time, organizations must adopt new media in order to stay up-to-date with business functions in the modern times.

=== Concurrency ===
In April 1993, Valacich et al. suggested that in light of new media, concurrency be included as an additional characteristic to determine a medium's richness. They define environmental concurrency to represent "the communication capacity of the environment to support distinct communication episodes, without detracting from any other episodes that may be occurring simultaneously between the same or different individuals." Furthermore, they explain that while this idea of concurrency could be applied to the media described in Daft and Lengel's original theories, new media provide a greater opportunity for concurrency than ever before.

== Applications ==
Explanatory diagram

=== Industries ===
==== Organizational and business communications ====
Media richness theory was originally conceived in an organizational communication setting to better understand interaction within companies. MRT is used to determine the "best" medium for an individual or organization to communicate a message. For example, organizations may find that important decisions need to be discussed in face-to-face interactions; using email would not be an adequate channel.

From an organizational perspective, high level personnel may require verbal media to help solve many of their problems. Entry-level positions with clear, unambiguous tasks may be fulfilled with written media forms. From an individual perspective, though, people prefer oral communication because the abundant communicative cues afford more accurate and efficient interpretation of the message.

An information-processing perspective of organizations also highlights the important role of communication. This perspective suggests that organizations gather information from their environment, process this information, and then act on it. As environmental complexity, turbulence, and information load increase, organizational communication increases. The organization's effectiveness in processing information becomes paramount when the business environment is complex and wrought with rapid change.

Today, companies use technologies such as video conferencing, which enable participants to see each other even when in separate locations. This technology affords organizations the opportunity to have richer communication than via traditional conference calls which only provide audio cues to the participants involved.

==== Media sensitivity and job performance ====
Daft and Lengel also assert that not all executives or managers in organizations demonstrate the same skill in making effective media choices for communications. High performing executives or managers tend to be more "sensitive" to richness requirements in media selection than low performing managers. In other words, competent executives select rich media for non-routine messages and lean media for routine messages.

From the consensus and satisfaction perspectives, groups with a communication medium which is too lean for their task seem to experience more difficulties than groups with a communication medium which is too rich for their task. Additionally, face-to-face groups achieved higher consensus change, higher decision satisfaction and higher decision scheme satisfaction than dispersed groups.

==== Job seeking and recruitment ====
In a job recruitment context, face-to-face interactions with company representatives, such as at career fairs, should be perceived by applicants as rich media. Career fairs allow instant feedback in the form of questions and answers and permit multiple cues including verbal messages and body gestures and can be tailored to each job seeker's interests and questions.

In comparison, static messages like reading information on a company's website or browsing an electronic bulletin board can be defined as leaner media since they are not customized to the individual needs of job seekers; they are asynchronous in their feedback and, since they are primarily text-based, there are no opportunities for verbal inflections or body gestures. This interaction between job seekers and potential employers affects how candidates process information about the organization. The interactions a candidate has with a potential employer via lean and rich media shape a job seeker's beliefs. Some employers have started using more vivid tools to answer questions about job recruitment such as videos, animations and virtual agents. Counterintuitively, elements which are more interactive like the US Army's virtual agent, Sgt. Starr, have been shown to hinder information transfer for ambiguous or complex messages such as a company's value or mission.

==== Virtual teams and teleworking ====
Many organizations are distributed globally with employees on a single team located in many different time zones. In order to facilitate productive cooperation and team dynamics, organizations benefit from considering the technology tools that are provided for coworking and communication. Workman, Kahnweiler, and Bommer (2003) found that an ideal teleworking design would feature a variety of types of media, ranging from lean to rich, in which workers can choose the media that is most suitable for their working style and the task at hand. Further, different jobs may require different types of media. Jobs that are more concrete and structured like planning, administration or operations may be sustainable with lean media options while software design and development which inherently has much more uncertainty and negotiation is best supported by richer media channels.

A 2009 study exploring the dynamics of virtual teams showed that the use of richer media in virtual work environments decreased perceived social loafing, or the feeling that a group member's individual contributions are not noticed or valued.

==== Corporate social responsibility ====
The concept of corporate social responsibility (CSR), which originally gained prominence in the 1960s, describes a company's self-regulation in the compliance of the ethical and moral standards. Public companies often describe their CSR efforts as an aspect of marketing campaigns in order to appeal to customers. Sat and Selemat (2014) found that customers were more affected by such messages when they were communicated through rich channels instead of lean ones.

=== Media ===
While media richness theory's application to new media has been contested (see "Criticism"), it is still used heuristically as a basis for studies examining new media.

==== Websites and hypertext ====
Websites can vary in their richness. In a study examining representations of the former Yugoslavia on the World Wide Web, Jackson and Purcell proposed that hypertext plays a role in determining the richness of individual websites. They developed a framework of criteria in which the use of hypertext on a website can be evaluated in terms of media richness characteristics as set forth by Daft and Lengel in their original theoretical literature. Furthermore, in their 2004 article, Simon and Peppas examined product websites' richness in terms of multimedia use. They classified "rich media sites" as those that included text, pictures, sounds and video clips, while the "lean media sites" contained only text. In their study, they created four sites (two rich and two lean) to describe two products (one simple, one complex). They found that most users, regardless of the complexity of the product, preferred the websites that provided richer media.

Rich media on websites also has the potential to stimulate action in the physical world. Lu, Kim, Dou and Kumar (2014) demonstrated that websites with 3D views of a fitness center were more successful in creating a student's intention to visit the gym than a website with static 2D images.

==== Instant messaging and texting ====
Media richness theory implies that a sender should select a medium of appropriate richness to communicate the desired message or fulfill a specific task. Senders that use less-rich communication media must consider the limitations of that medium in the dimensions of feedback, multiple cues, message tailoring, and emotions. Take for example the relative difficulty of determining whether a modern text message is serious or sarcastic in tone. The leanness of the text prevents the transmission of tone and facial expression which would otherwise be useful in detecting the sarcasm. However, results from a study conducted by Anandarajan et al. on Generation Y's use of instant messaging conclude that "the more users recognize IM as a rich communication medium, the more likely they believe this medium is useful for socialization." Though Generation Y users consider texting to be a rich medium, there is additional evidence that shows that easily accessible and non-intrusive media (i.e., texting, Twitter) were more likely to be used for sharing positive than negative events, and intrusive and rich media (i.e., phone calling) were more likely to be used for sharing negative than positive events. Additionally, in order to better understand teenagers' use of MSN (later called Microsoft Messenger service), Sheer examined the effect of both media richness and communication control. Among other findings, Sheer's study demonstrated that "rich features, such as webcam and MSN Spaces seemingly facilitated the increase of acquaintances, new friends, opposite-sex friends, and, thus, the total number of friends."

==== E-mail ====
In recent years, as the general population has become more e-mail savvy, the lines have blurred somewhat between face-to-face and e-mail communication. E-mail is now thought of as a verbal tool, with its capacity to enable immediate feedback, leverage natural language, and embed emotion via acronyms and emoticons.

However, there is a downside of e-mail: volume overload. Emails often have large, unnecessary quantities of information that are non-job essential or spam. Filtering through this junk does require additional time. The time required to manage email can cause an information overload. With excess email, people may feel that they will miss information due to the sheer volume on content they receive. Some individuals may find this volume to be a barrier to swift responses to emails.

Email do have the capacity to transmit more informational content than other channels such as voicemail. Perception of email as a rich platform varies among users though. This perception contributes to how the individual will use the channel. For some, the choice of content will differ. They may include images or videos if they recognize email as a rich channel whereas others may only leverage text. This perception also affects choice of linguistic features. Those that see email as similar to an oral channel will type differently than those who see email as a written channel.

Parents favor using email to communicate in cases that involve their child's academic status. When communicating to teachers, parents favored a more asynchronous form of messaging, to clearly state their concerns about their children. This, in turn, creates a clear communication channel between the teacher and parent.

==== Email and Virtual Teamwork ====
When virtual teams were tasked in completing projects, many directed their attention towards email, even though it ranks lower in richness. Emails, although low in richness, provide the rehearsability and reprocessability (ability to read over messages before sending and read over to facilitate better understanding) than other mediums higher in richness may not.

==== Video conferencing ====
Video conference software has been used not only for virtual teams in large companies, but also for classrooms and casual conversations. Software or Video Conferencing Systems (VCS) such as Skype and Google Hangouts allow for more visual cues than just audio conversations. Research suggests that VCS is somewhere between the telephone and face-to-face meetings in terms of media richness. Even though video conferencing does not have the same richness as face-to-face conversations, a study regarding video conferencing has said that richer content-presentation types were positively correlated with higher concentration levels but showed mixed results when correlated with perceived usefulness.

==== Facebook ====
The social media platform, Facebook, has been found to be even richer than email. Facebook business pages offer such features as immediate feedback from customers, linkage to additional webpages, customization to customers/potential customers, as well as a language variety. Businesses have been able to use this platform to successfully connect with their customers but at a cost of quality and access potentially decreasing.

=== Other applications ===
==== Relational communication ====
Kashian and Walther (2018) find that asynchronous communication is a better medium for reducing conflict between people who have generally positive opinions/attributions of their partners than does the face-to-face medium. The authors credit relational intimacy and attending positive attributions made by the partners as a potential reason for overcoming asynchronous communication's alleged shortcomings as espoused by the media synchronicity theory, which "[contends] that synchronous media are best for convergent conflict communication" (2018, p. 7, citing Dennis et al., 2008). The authors conclude, "asynchronous CMC is a beneficial medium for online conflict among satisfied couples" (2018, p. 19).

In another study, Koutamanis et al. (2013) suggest that adolescents' engagement through instant messaging may actually serve to improve their respective abilities to enter into in-person relationships in the real world. The authors focus on textual communication via electronic means. Although the written word is generally considered to be one of the leanest forms of communication regardless of how it is delivered according to the media richness theory, this study illustrates how texting may enhance adolescents' ability to later succeed with face-to-face interactions that come after a certain amount of interaction through textual correspondence.

In a 2016 article, Lisiecka et al. point out that, although it has been generally accepted that "media other than face-to-face are considered an obstacle rather than an equally effective means of information transfer" (2016, p. 13), their results suggest that computer-mediated communication "has become similarly natural and intuitive as face-to-face contacts" (2016, p. 13).

Tong and Walther (2015) argue that unlike predictions attributed to early computer-mediated communication theories like the media richness (Daft & Lengel, 1986) and media naturalness (Kock, 2004) theories, nonverbal communication may not be "essential to the behavioral transfer and perceptual interpretation of expectancies" (2015, p. 204). And further suggest that face-to-face communication may negatively skew people's interactions if the participants' first impressions are influenced by biases that are responsive to visual cues.

==== Deception ====
Deception, in the context of communication theory, occurs when the sender knowingly conveys a false message to the receiver. According to Buller and Burgoon, "deception occurs when communicators control the information contained in their messages to convey a meaning that departs from the truth as they know it." This idea is central to the Interpersonal deception theory. Additional research has analyzed the relationship between media richness and the communication of deceptive messages. Richer media, especially those that transmit non-verbal cues such tone of voice, facial expression or gestures, show lesser incidences of deceptive messages than lean media. By leveraging a richer media, interlocutors develop stronger affective bonds which mitigates the likelihood that one speaker will try to deceive another. When honesty is not considered the best policy, leaner media, such as e-mail, allows for a stronger possibility of deception.

==== Distance education and e-books ====
In evaluating students' satisfaction with distance courses, Sheppherd and Martz concluded that a course's use of media rich technology affected how students evaluated the quality of the course. Courses that utilized tools such as "discussion forums, document sharing areas, and web casting" were viewed more favorably. Lai and Chang in 2011 used media richness as a variable in their study examining user attitudes towards e-books, stating that the potential for rich media content like embedded hyperlinks and other multimedia additions, offered users a different reading experience than a printed book. Further research by Lan and Sie (2010), that within the category of text based communication channels, there are significant differences that should shape an instructor's choice of technology. They studied the use of SMS, email and RSS and found that SMS is suitable for fast delivery, email affords greater content richness and RSS is the ideal format for content presentation on front-end mobile devices.

E-books and e-learning are becoming recurrent tools in the academic landscape. One of the key characteristics of e-learning is its capability to integrate different media, such as text, picture, audio, animation and video to create multimedia instructional material. Media selection in e-learning can be a critical issue because of the increased costs of developing non-textual e-learning materials. Learners can benefit from the use of richer media in courses that contain equivocal and complex content; however, learners achieve no significant benefit in either learner score or learner satisfaction from the use of richer media in courses containing low equivocal (numeric) content.

==== Nursing ====
The transition from analog to digital record keeping in medical care has been at the forefront of medical innovation.. Castro, Favela, and Gracia-Pena studied the effects of different media (face to face, telephone and videoconferencing) on nursing consultations in emergency calls. They found that while there were no efficacy differences between media, richer media did facilitate faster consultations and resolutions. Videoconferencing may result in less eye contact than if the nurse was face to face with the patient.

==== Finding physicians and healthcare providers ====
Despite interpersonal communication being a key ingredient in medical encounters, and physician communication being one of the most important qualities patients indicate in their selection of a new doctor, healthcare organizations do not do a very good job helping their prospective patients understand how a new doctor would communicate with them in future encounters through their online biographies - most only providing "lean" biographies of text, and very few providing "richer" video introductions. Video introductions provide the opportunity to help patients actually see how a physician might interact within a consultation. Perrault and Silk tested what effects richer video introductions of doctors might have on patients when they are in this decision-making phase. They uncovered that when participants were exposed to a richer video introduction of the physician that uncertainty was reduced to a greater extent than when they were only exposed a lean, text-based biography. Participants were also more likely to choose to want to visit the doctor who provided the richer video introduction over the leaner text biography.

==== Civic engagement ====
General image emphasizing difference in neurological thoughts between genders

Media used online also has been successfully proven to stimulate civic engagement. Leveraging the Internet to facilitate public deliberation has been proven to be a successful and cost-effective way to engage large volumes of citizens. Studies have shown that mixed modality media (both rich and lean) can be useful in citizen education and engagement. Through the creation of new social networks and various online platforms, media allows for many more opportunities of "greater visibility and community building potential of cultural citizenship's previous 'ephemeral' practices." The explosion of creativity on the internet can be linked to formal institutions such as government and education in order to allow for a broader participation base, leading to stronger engagement of citizens and gaining access to a wider range of insight and knowledge.

==== Gender and Media Richness Theory ====
Studies have been conducted to determine which medias allow different genders to become more productive in the workplace. In Gender Differences in the Effects of Media Richness the researchers found that women tend to work better with nonverbal communication than men. In general, nonverbal cues and communication is more easily broken down by women, due to their ability to be expressive more frequently than men.

Researchers found that men are more likely to appreciate task-oriented projects where women prefer social-oriented activities. Men are found to be able to make quicker decisions while women facilitate conversations deeply in order to fully understand what is being talked about.

== Criticism ==
=== Scope of the theory ===
Media richness theory has been criticized by what many researchers saw as its deterministic nature. Markus argues that social pressures can influence media use much more strongly than richness, and in ways that are inconsistent with MRT's key tenets. It has also been noted that media richness theory should not assume that the feelings towards using a richer media in a situation are completely opposite to using a leaner media. In fact, media choice is complex and in general even if a rich media is considered to be the "best" to communicate a message, a leaner media may still be able to communicate the message. In addition, for some tasks, the type of media used will make no difference to the accuracy of the communicated message.

In selecting a medium for message transmission, an individual will also consider his or her comfort with the possible options. If an individual is uncomfortable or unfamiliar with using an email system to distribute a message, and view learning to send an email as more time-consuming and inefficient than simply having a group meeting, he or she may choose a richer medium instead of a more efficient medium. This behavior outcome, through irrational, is certainly a reflection upon the previously established experience.

=== Cultural and social limitations ===
Ngwenyama and Lee show that cultural and social background influence media choice by individuals in ways that are incompatible with predictions based on media richness theory; their paper received the Paper of the Year Award in the journal MIS Quarterly. Ngwenyama and Lee are not alone in their critiques regarding the limitations of media richness theory, particularly in regards to cultural and individual characteristics. Research by Ook Lee demonstrated that in a Confucian virtual work environment where showing respect is essential, a communication channel's ability to convey cultural protocol is more important than the richness of the channel. In 2009, Gerritsen's study concluded that in business contexts, culture does play a role in determining the receiver's preference of medium, perhaps in terms of the specific culture's threshold for uncertainty avoidance.

Additionally, Dennis, Kinney, and Hung found that in terms of the actual performance of equivocal tasks, the richness of a medium has the most notable effect on teams composed entirely of females. On the other hand, "matching richness to task equivocality did not improve decision quality, time, consensus, or communication satisfaction for all-male or mixed-gender teams." Individually speaking, Barkhi demonstrated that communication mode and cognitive style can play a role in media preference and selection, suggesting that even in situations with identical messages and intentions, the "best" media selection can vary from person to person.

=== Application to new media ===
Additionally, because media richness theory was developed before widespread use of the internet, which also introduced media like email, chat rooms, instant messaging, smartphone, and more, some have questioned its ability to accurately predict what new media users may choose. Several studies have been conducted that examine media choice when given options considered to be "new media", such as voice mail and email. Blau, Weiser, and Eshet-Alkalai study the differences and similarities of perceived and actual outcomes for students who take the same class either online or in traditional classroom settings. The authors conclude that face-to-face classroom settings are not superior to online classrooms. Further, they also suggest that a "high level of medium naturalness might hinder the understanding of a very complicated type of knowledge", which is the opposite of what the media richness theory predicts. El-Shinnaway and Markus hypothesized that, based on media richness theory, individuals would choose to communicate messages over the more rich medium of voice mail than via email, but found that even when sending more equivocal messages, the leaner medium of email was used. Also, it has been indicated that given the expanded capabilities of new media, media richness theory's unidimensional approach to categorizing different communication media in no longer sufficient to capture all the dimensions in which media types can vary.

== Related theories ==
=== Media naturalness ===
Several new theories have been developed based on Daft and Lengel's original framework. Kock (2004) argues that human non-lexical communication methods and apparatus, such as facial expressions, gestures, and body language, have evolved for millions of years, and as such, must be important to the naturalness of communication between people. Media Naturalness Theory hypothesizes that because face-to-face communication is the most "natural" method of communication, we should want our other communication methods to resemble face-to-face communication as closely as possible. While media richness theory places media on a scale that range from low to high in richness and places face-to-face communication at the top of the scale, Media Naturalness Theory thinks of face-to-face communication as the middle in a scale, and states that the further away one gets from face-to-face (either more or less rich), the more cognitive processing is required to comprehend a message.

=== Media compensation ===
The 2011 media compensation theory by Hantula, Kock, D'Arcy, and DeRosa refines Kock's media naturalness theory. The authors explain that the media compensation theory has been developed to specifically address two paradoxes:

1. Virtual communication, work, collaboration, and teams are largely successful (sometimes even more so than face-to-face equivalents) which conflicts with Kock's media naturalness theory; and,
2. "The human species evolved in small groups using communications modalities in constrained areas, yet use electronic communication media to allow large groups to work together effectively across time and space" (Hantula et al., 2011, p. 358).

The authors grapple with how humans "who have not changed much in many millennia" (Hantula et al., 2011, p. 358) are able to successfully embrace and employ lean media, such as texting, considering their assumption that human evolution has progressed down a path toward, and adeptness for, face-to-face communication, and conclude that elements of the media naturalness theory can coexist with Carlson and Zmud's channel expansion theory.

=== Media synchronicity ===
To help explain media richness and its application to new media, media synchronicity theory was proposed. Media richness is also related to adaptive structuration theory and social information processing theory, in which instead of focusing on object physical attributions of the media, shift towards social construction of the media. Media synchronicity theory, however, is a theory of communication performance that does not investigate why people choose which media to use. Synchronicity describes the ability of a medium to create the sense that all participants are concurrently engaged in the communication event. Media with high degrees of synchronicity, such as face-to-face meetings, offer participants the opportunity to communicate in real time, immediately observe the reactions and responses of others, and easily determine whether co-participants are fully engaged in the conversation.

Media synchronicity theory states that every communication interaction is composed of two processes: conveyance and convergence. The processes are necessary for completing tasks. Conveyance is about the transmission of new information, while convergence is about reaching an agreement. For tasks that require convergence, media with high degrees of synchronicity, such as face-to-face meetings and video conferences, offer participants the opportunity to communicate at the same time, and develop interpersonal reactions to reach an agreement through discussion. For tasks that require conveyance, media with low degrees of synchronicity such as e-mail and SMS texts allows participants to receive information regardless of geographical dispersion and time zone and have more time to process new information without the necessity to debate with others.

Media synchronicity theory also states that each medium has a set of abilities. These abilities include: transmission velocity, parallelism, symbol sets, rehearsability, and accessibility. The transmission velocity of a message refers to how quickly the recipient receives it from the sender; parallelism refers to the number of messages that can be conveyed at the same time; symbol sets are the number of ways that recipients can interpret the message, such as verbal and visual cues; rehearsability is the extent to which the sender can revise and edit messages before sending out, and reprocessability is the degree to which recipients can retrieve and re-interpret messages. According to the theory, choosing a medium with capabilities that match information transmission and processing requirements can make communication more effective.

==== Applications ====
The applications of media synchronicity theory include negotiations, virtual team collaborations, and communication during disasters. During negotiations, if both communicators are familiar with each other and know about the subprocesses to complete tasks, then the need for synchronicity will be lower. Negotiations can be more effective if the group has discussed the requirement through media with low synchronicity before synchronous meetings, as the group can remove uncertainties before reaching convergence. The rehearsability of the media also has a positive impact on satisfaction. Positive messages transmitted through asynchronous text-based electronically mediated negotiations (TBEM) yields higher negotiator satisfaction than face-to-face negotiations (FTF). Virtual collaborations are considered to be activities that require convergence, and groups with 3D space that provide rooms for synchronous discussion have higher task performances than groups using text-based chat. However, if a mobile-enabling discussion is also provided during the collaborations, its high parallelism and reprocessability can improve user experience and task performance. During natural disasters, the purpose of risk communication is to educate people about the situation, so conveyance processes are required. A medium with relatively low synchronicity is preferred. Crisis communication, on the other hand, has the purpose of sharing individuals' understandings which requires convergence. A medium with relatively high synchronicity is preferred. A single social platform can have different sets of capabilities depending on features, and people can manipulate symbol sets such as hashtags and the number of words in a post, to maximize the effectiveness of communication. Synchronous channels are helpful for urgent situations especially in more vulnerable areas, while asynchronous channels are useful for governments and utility service providers in their attempts to amplify their crisis management messages and expand the reach of information related to evacuation and recovery.

=== Channel expansion ===
Channel expansion theory was proposed by Carlson and Zmud (1999) to explain the inconsistencies found in several empirical studies. In these studies, the results showed that managers would employ "leaner" media for tasks of high equivocality. Channel expansion theory suggested that individual's media choice has a lot to do with individual's experience with the medium itself, with the communicator and also with the topic. Thus it is possible that an individual's experience with using a certain lean medium, will prompt that individual to use it for equivocal tasks. For example, a study by Kahai, Carroll, and Jestice (2007) showed that participants' familiarity with instant messaging led them to perceive the medium as richer than the virtual world known as Second Life. Participants' lack of experience with the objectively richer virtual world may have affected their perception when compared to the more familiar medium of instant messaging.

However, the theory does not suggest that knowledge-building experiences will necessarily equalize differences in richness, whether objective or perceptually-based, across different media. Put in another way, knowledge-building experiences may be positively related to perceptions of the richness of email, but this does not necessarily mean that email will be viewed as richer than another medium, such as face-to-face interaction

== See also ==
- Communication theory
- Emotions in virtual communication
- Hyperpersonal model
- Multicommunicating
- Social identity model of deindividuation effects (SIDE)
- Telecommuting
- Theories of technology
