= Emotions in virtual communication =

Emotions in virtual communication are expressed and understood in a variety of different ways from those in face-to-face interactions. Virtual communication continues to evolve as technological advances emerge that give way to new possibilities in computer-mediated communication (CMC). The lack of typical auditory and visual cues associated with human emotion gives rise to alternative forms of emotional expression that are cohesive with many different virtual environments. Some environments provide only space for text based communication, where emotions can only be expressed using words. More newly developed forms of expression provide users the opportunity to portray their emotions using images.

In contrast to in-person interactions, emotions in virtual communication are restricted to the possibilities provided by the software being used. Likewise, different platforms and software benefit users with individual advantages that are specific to each virtual environment. The emergence of emoticons allows for the employment of nonverbal cues in computer mediated communication. Ongoing research in this area investigates how and when individuals display and interpret various emotions in virtual settings.

== Expression ==
A smiley face might reassure the recipient of a message—or be interpreted as sarcasm.

Text-based emotional expression first appeared through bulletin board systems (BBS), emails, internet-based chatrooms, instant messaging (IM), and social networks. Without physically being able to interpret facial expressions, tone of voice, and body language, early internet users struggled to interpret emotional expressions. Like how Ancient Egyptians used hieroglyphics to record emotions through stories and history early chat room users created emotional language using punctuation marks and rearranging symbolic characters. Adaptations such as emoticons were implemented for the purpose of expressing emotion and tone around 1872. They produced inotations, and gestures that were effective in expressing emotion. Emotional experience has been found to elicit social sharing of emotional climates by processing emotional contagion, and conformity with group and social norms in recent studies. Effectiveness of these text-based communication methods depends on factors such as the attitude and context between senders and receivers.

=== Emojis ===
Emoji is a Japanese word meaning "picture letter", which is a pictorial symbol that represents something. Originating from Japanese designer Shigetaka Kurita the pixelated symbol is derived from the English word "emotion". Emojis can express emotion by creating feelings, or concepts in text messages and other electronic communication. Emojis including facial expressions, gestures, common objects, places and types of weather, and animals. In emotional communication, emojis do not perfectly mirror non-verbal signs in face-to-face communication.

=== AI ===
AI in virtual communication is referred to as affective computing (emotion AI). Developing around 1995, emotion AI decodes facial expressions, analyzes voice patterns and monitors eye movements and more to interpret and produce human emotional signals in text, audio, video formats. Emotional AI has the goal of creating human-like interactions in digital atmospheres to improve the overall quality of virtual communication. Proven very effective in emotional expression studies from 2020 show that computer technology has advanced enough that a positive congruent response by a virtual agent can overcome the effect of believing that the agent is a computer program. We can thus achieve effective human–virtual agent communication.

== Interpretation ==
One of the reasons that emails that are intended to be positive may come across as more neutral is that the process of email itself tends to be less stimulating than face-to-face communication. Since many people tend to associate emails with work-related matters, they come to expect less positive affect to be displayed in emails. Furthermore, the emotional ambiguity of email messages may actually lead to them to be interpreted as more negatively than they were intended. Byron (2008) notes that emails from senders higher in status will be more likely be perceived as negative than emails received from people who are lower in status.

=== Sexting ===
Sexting is defined as the exchange of intimate messages, images, and/or videos digitally. Often linked with negative outcomes, such as an increase in depression, anxiety or cyberbullying, sexting occurs in approximately 11% of the adolescent population. Despite these native associations, sexting has also been shown to have positive effects on sexual relief and body image reinforcement when done with an established partner. Sexting in virtual communication acts as an avenue for sexual pleasure, and has been shown to enhance the sexual aspects of relationships, despite primarily occurring in adolescents.

== Controversies ==
The lack of social cues in CMC has been found to have a depersonalizing effect. Additionally, there can be greater anonymity or perceptions of anonymity in virtual communication. This combination of anonymous and social detached communication has been shown to increase the likelihood of flaming, or angry and hostile language as a result of uninhibited behavior. These hostile attacks are more often seen online than in face-to-face communication and emotional expression.

Computer mediated communication may also result in increased instances of misinterpreting emotion and intentions. Kruger, Epley, Parker, and Ng (2005) found that individuals overestimate both their ability to clearly relay and interpret emotions via email. They attribute this inability to relay emotions effectively to others over CMC to a combination of egocentrism and a lack of paralinguistic cues including gestures, emphasis, and intonations.

Given the permanent and potentially public nature of virtual communication, it is much more likely that unintended parties will view and interpret messages as opposed face-to-face communication, which is fleeting. It has been found that when third parties view virtual communications, these parties may interpret interactions as contentious disputes. This can create conflict in situations where the participating individuals did not intend there to be any.

Increased emotional cues allow for better detection of negative affect, and greater displays of positive affect to counter any negative emotions. Immediacy of feedback relates to how quickly messages are transmitted via a particular communication medium, and the expectation for which they will be responded. For example, instant messaging has a higher degree of immediacy of feedback than email because instant messaging tends to result in much more synchronous communication than email. Immediacy of feedback allows individuals to detect and address frustration and other negative emotions more quickly.

== See also ==
- Affective computing
- Computer-mediated communication
- Media richness theory
- Social presence theory
- Theories of technology
