= Media adequacy =

Media adequacy refers to specific (i.e. media) aspects that are important for a successful transfer of information. This implies that not all information can be reproduced in an equally adequate way with every medium.

== Definition ==
The successful transfer of information depends on various aspects. An important aspect is of course the content itself. Depending on the goal, purpose and methods, the question of whether and why an information transfer is successful can depend on a more or less successful content preparation. Further decisive factors can lie in the reception and the user's specific situation in its context (which is examined in recipient research, learner research, etc.), as well as in the social situation, which in turn depends on a variety of aspects, such as gender, culture, learning style etc. It is however often underestimated that the channel via which information is transferred can also be of decisive importance. Question then is which medium makes it possible to convey a specific content as well as possible (and which medium is more of a hindrance).

In general, it can be said that not all content can be transmitted equally well with every medium. One example is the Watergate Affair, which after all led to the fall of a US president. It was uncovered by a daily newspaper that is read by relatively few (though certainly influential and opinion-forming) people - but not by television, which is seen by many more viewers. The main reason is that television reports are only effective if they can be illustrated; this was hardly possible in the case of television reports about an illegal wiretapping. In the newspaper, on the other hand, it was possible to describe how the information from an (anonymous, i.e. not visually known) source was verified. The medium and its production constraints thus (partly) decide whether and how content can be presented or how effective the transfer of information is.

== Research topics ==
As a rule, the respective research is normative and it is investigated what influences (promotes or hinders) a successful transfer of information: Only what can be realised sensibly and efficiently in a particular medium should also be realised in that medium. If the researcher's perspective is not based on the recipient or the content, but on the medium, media adequacy is the central category. Only what can be realised sensibly and efficiently in a particular medium should also be realised in that medium.

The term “medium” refers not only to the means of communication, but also to different genres. In the case of the Watergate Affair, for example, the transfer of information with the help of television was only successful in the form of secondary reporting. This did not mean, however, that visual communication is fundamentally impossible with a topic like this. The genre of the feature film was very successful and effective ("All the President's Men"). The question of media adequacy thus relates more to genres (in the field of print media: text types) and not only to primary media.

In addition to the constraints of production, the conditions of reception also play a role. Content on a website has a different effect when it is received on a tablet or a stationary computer. Using one and the same content via the Internet is more successful compared to working with the same content on a DVD. Thus, the medium is as important as other variables, for example the learner type (social learner type, introspective learner type). Another example: Icelandic singer Björk was the first artist to promote a music album not only with music videos but also with interactive apps; this app compilation, created by media artist Scott Snibbe, was later acquired by the Museum of Modern Art as the first downloadable app artwork. From an innovative and artistic point of view, this was a remarkable achievement. However, the compilation proved to be counterproductive in terms of its effect on the music to which the apps, like music videos, were intended to relate. Although music videos offer additional visual information that can distract from the music, they generally support the respective song and focus attention on the piece of music. In contrast, the interactive apps were cognitively dominant and were therefore unable to develop the effect for which they were produced.

Ultimately, it is a question of complex interactions between content, medium and reception process.

In contrast to, for example, content analysis or reception or learner research, the scientific study of media adequacy is relatively new. It is only since the triumph of microelectronics that not only specialists have been able to publish with their medium. Meanwhile, in many areas there is the possibility (and opportunity, but often also the compulsion) to work cross-medially, so that the question of the appropriate (media-adequate) presentation of content becomes urgent.

== History, theory, observations ==
There are various theories about the use of media in different contexts and regarding different objectives. The approaches of Herbert Marshall McLuhan are well known, as is the "media richness theory" by Richard Daft and Robert Lengel. Daft and Lengel speak of different degrees of "media richness" depending on how much the media is absorbed: Less "rich" media are not intensive enough to attract a user's full and undisturbed attention (for example: discussion forums, chats, e-mails or other forms of textual communication). This almost inevitably leads to a certain attention deficit. The use of weak media therefore means that utilising such media requires a greater cognitive effort on the part of the user. Perhaps this is why greater self-discipline is required in the context of media-supported learning than in traditional learning situations.

Relatively new, however, is the attempt to link media theory statements with studies on cognitive styles., Usually it is referred to traditional teaching, and it of course has to be taken into consideration that there are differences between information processing and learning (Rehder/Hoffmann 2005). The common factor, however, is how one takes in and processes information and might even be able to adapt to new developments, to solve problems and reaches decisions. A pioneering theoretical approach to this is, for example, the "cognitive load theory" that relates considerations from Robert J. Sternberg to media effects.

Sternberg's "theory of mental self-government" is quite complex and therefore sometimes difficult to operationalise. It assumes that under ideal (and free) conditions learners organise the learning process in accordance with their cognitive abilities. This leads to different forms of mental representations or different codings, and thus to different forms of how to use media.

All in all, it seems to be clear that a successful information transfer depends on the situation and the strategies of how content is mediatised. With some users, it might be successful in the context of interactive group processes, whilst others need quietness to concentrate. This example has been chosen because it connects cognitive styles with media effects. The former group will probably benefit significantly from discussion forums. For introspective users, on the other hand, they would more likely be a hindrance in the process of a successful information transfer. Another example: it has also long been known that some - not all - learners learn best by observing. Obviously, mirror neurons become active when they see corresponding efforts by other learners, so that their self-motivation and ultimately their learning success increases. Here it can be assumed that examples from the media (such as television programmes) can also have a positive effect. Conversely, other learners must have their own experiences in order to store and process information successfully. Mediated communication therefore means a limitation for them; on the other hand, it could be that users with individual concepts for learning have an advantage through and in online learning environments - at least compared to the 'observant learner type'.

Furthermore, different cognitive styles require a different density and volume of information in order to ultimately benefit from information transfer efforts in the context of meta cognitive processes. Perhaps this explains the findings of Baruch and Nicholson, who observed that learners with a high tendency to avoid uncertainty - i.e. who have only a low willingness to take risks - tend to feel uncomfortable with self-learning media. There are also parallels to another observation described above: Since online media increase the degree of ambiguity both in terms of tasks and expectations of the respective user, users with a lower tolerance of uncertainty avoidance are disadvantaged, while users with a higher degree of uncertainty avoidance can even generate further advantages.

In assessing whether the use is meaningful at all, the observation that a media-supported information transfer is fundamentally more time-intensive than traditional learning also seems significant. Accordingly, it is important to use media-supported learning materials in such a way that the added value in terms of content is correspondingly high and the majority of learners benefit from it.

There are other variables whose effects for a successful information transfer by now have been little or not at all investigated, at least not from a media perspective (such as gender, the cultural imprint of the media user, etc.). Summarising, it is desirable to know whether and how a media-supported information transfer can be established sensibly and efficiently. However, it is questionable whether a system can be developed that links content, user type and medium, since the mentioned variables and their interactions already give rise to too many different situations, not least since technical developments are constantly changing the media and their effects.
