= Ederyn Williams =

British academic, commentator and writer

Ederyn Williams (born 21 September 1946) is a British academic, commentator and writer whose work focuses on social presence theory and technology transfer.

== Early life and education ==
Williams is the son of the Welsh academic and television critic Raymond Williams. Williams earned a DPhil in Psychology from the University of Oxford in 1971.

== Social presence theory ==
Williams, along with fellow social psychologists Bruce Christie and John Short, developed social presence theory in 1976. Social presence theory is defined as "the degree of salience of the other person in the interaction and consequent salience of the interpersonal relationships." This theory argues that media differ in their ability to convey intimacy and immediacy. Social presence theory is a key theory in understanding interpersonal communication and has found to be a strong indicator in satisfaction.

== Career ==
He worked at British Telecom on a 'viewdata' system called Prestel. This was similar to the much more successful French system Minitel. It never got more than 90,000 subscribers. Both systems were replaced by the Internet and World Wide Web.

He wrote an assessment in 1979: Strengths and weaknesses of Prestel.

In the early 1980s, Williams was briefly the head of the short-lived gaming company, Telecomsoft.

In 1991, Williams became the Managing Director of Leeds Innovations Ltd. at the University of Leeds. In 2000, Williams joined the University of Warwick, where he founded an academic department that later became Warwick Ventures Ltd. The company branded itself as a technology commercialisation company. In April 2010, Williams was awarded the Queen's Award for Enterprise Promotion for his pivotal role in the development of "knowledge transfer from universities to businesses in the UK." Williams retired from Warwick Ventures in September 2011 and now serves as the Director of Biosite Systems Ltd.
