= M. Lynne Markus =

- Born: c. 1950 (age 75–76)
- Education: Case Western Reserve University
- Occupations: Professor; Consultant
- Employer: Bentley University

M. Lynne Markus (born c. 1950) is an American Information systems researcher, and John W. Poduska Sr. Chair of Information and Process Management, Bentley University, who has made fundamental contributions to the study of enterprise systems and inter-enterprise systems, IT and organizational change, and knowledge management.

== Education ==
Markus received her B.S. in 1972 from the University of Pittsburgh, and her PhD in Organizational Behavior in 1979 from the Case Western Reserve University.

== Career and research ==
She was formerly a member of the Faculty of Business at the City University of Hong Kong (as Chair Professor of Electronic Business), the Peter F. Drucker Graduate School of Management at Claremont Graduate University, the Anderson Graduate School of Management (UCLA), and the MIT Sloan School of Management.

Markus' research interests are in the fields of "effective design, implementation and use of information systems within and across organizations; the risks and unintended consequences of information technology use; and innovations in the governance and management of information technology."

Her work in these areas has been published in several high-impact peer-reviewed journals, and set the stage for much of the future work in these areas. She is one of the most widely cited researchers in the field of information systems.

Her article "The Technology Shaping Effects of E-Collaboration Technologies – Bugs and Features" was selected as the best article published in 2005 in the International Journal of e-Collaboration. The article "Industry-Wide Information Systems Standardization as Collective Action: The Case of the U.S. Residential Mortgage Industry", which she co-authored, was selected as the paper of the year for 2006 in the journal MIS Quarterly.

== Awards and honours ==
- Best article published in 2005 in the International Journal of e-Collaboration.
- Paper of the year for 2006 in the journal MIS Quarterly.
- 2008 Leo Award for Exceptional Lifetime Achievement in Information Systems by the Association for Information Systems.

== Selected publications ==
- Markus, M. Lynne, and Robert I. Benjamin. 1997. The Magic Bullet Theory In IT-Enabled Transformation, Sloan Management Review, 38(2): 55–68.
- Markus, M. Lynne. 1983. Power, Politics, and MIS Implementation, Communications of the ACM, 26(6): 430–444.
- Markus, M. Lynne. 1987. Toward a 'Critical Mass' Theory of Interactive Media: Universal Access, Interdependence, and Diffusion, Communications Research, 14(5): 491–511.
- Markus, M. Lynne and Daniel Robey. 1988. Information Technology and Organizational Change: Causal Structure in Theory and Research, Management Science, 34(5): 583–598.
- Ortiz de Guinea, Ana and M. Lynne Markus. 2009. Why break the habit of a lifetime? Rethinking the roles of intention, habit, and emotion in continuing information technology use, MIS Quarterly, 33(3): 433–444.
