= Social presence theory =

Viewed social effects of communications technology

Social presence theory explores how the "sense of being with another" is influenced by digital interfaces in human-computer interactions. Developed from the foundations of interpersonal communication and symbolic interactionism, social presence theory was first formally introduced by John Short, Ederyn Williams, and Bruce Christie in The Social Psychology of Telecommunications. Research on social presence theory has recently developed to examine the efficacy of telecommunications media, including SNS communications. The theory notes that computer-based communication is lower in social presence than face-to-face communication, but different computer-based communications can affect the levels of social presence between communicators and receivers.

== Origins ==
The concept of social presence originated from Morton Wiener and Albert Mehrabian's study of immediacy and Michael Argyle and Janet Dean's concept of intimacy. Wiener and Mehrabian identified immediacy as nonverbal communication behaviors such as eye contact and body movements that can enhance closeness in interactions. Argyle and Dean noted intimacy as a combination of eye contact, physical proximity, and smiling.

The U.K.'s post office first funded Short et al.'s work in an attempt to observe customer's attitudes towards different media channels.

Social Presence Theory is defined by the different apparent physical proximities produced by various media, the two more popular media being face-to-face communication and online interaction. Social presence is measured by the ability to project physical and emotional presence and experience it from others in interactions. Effective communication is measured by the parties' interpersonal involvement while considering the constraints of the communication medium used.

Definitions of social presence are inconsistent, as scholars attempt to pinpoint what the phenomenon encompasses, and how it can be adapted as new media of interpersonal communication arise. Social Presence in recent years has been defined as the feeling of community a learner experiences in an online environment. We have developed multiple non-verbal intimacy behaviors in the online community that enhance our relationships with people when we communicate in a medium where there is no real-life contact.

== Additional Research ==
Patrick R. Lowenthal noted that concepts of social presence fall on a spectrum between users' perceptions of a person being real or "being there" and whether two communicators experience positive interpersonal and emotional connections between each other. Lowenthal believes that most researchers tend to fall somewhere on the spectrum between those two perceptions.

Other research has defined social presence as the awareness of others in an interaction, combined with an appreciation of the interpersonal aspects of that interaction. In 1995, Gunawardena argued that social presence varied with perception and was a subjective issue based upon objective qualities. We are social beings, and we crave socialization, and social presence explains how we form relationships and how beneficial and necessary they are to our lives.

The definitions and interpretations of social presence—given by multiple sources after the original work conducted by Short, Williams, and Christie—have offered a more unobstructed view that Social Presence is more of a combination of factors that present themselves in a way so as to develop greater intimacy within a group that has a positive effect on the individual's affective filters. Several researchers have suggested that intimacy and immediacy are contributing factors to Social Presence with intimacy defined as a measure of communication involving eye contact, proximity and body language and immediacy defined as the psychological distance between two parties that is conveyed through verbal and nonverbal cues in speech.

Chih-Hsiung Tu said that Short et al.'s definition was not satisfactory because it did not include all components of social presence. He also said that the theory did not address enough degrees of social presence in computer-mediated communications.

In 2000–2001, Tu argued that within distance learning, social presence rests upon three dimensions: social context, online communication, and interactivity. Social contexts contribute to a predictable degree of perceived social presence. Social contexts involve task orientation and privacy, topics, social relationships, and social process. A closely related theory, electronic propinquity, also examines this quality of human connection through technology.

== Classification of media ==
Social Presence Theory classifies different communication media on a one-dimensional continuum of social presence, where the degree of social presence is equated to the degree of awareness of the other person in a communication interaction.

Social Presence Theory in communication is effective if the communication medium has the appropriate social presence required for the level of interpersonal involvement required in an engagement, which is one of the challenges communicators have at the time of engaging their audience.

On a continuum of social presence, the face-to-face medium is considered to have the most social presence; and written, text-based communication the least. Inter-party and interpersonal exchanges are two aspects of interactions identified by Short, Williams, and Christie. It is assumed in Social Presence Theory that in any interaction involving two parties, both parties are concerned with acting out certain roles and developing or maintaining some sort of personal relationship.

=== Face-to-face interactions ===
The most basic of interactions are done face-to-face; and the participants exchange, in addition to verbal communication, a set of non-verbal cues, such as facial expression, direction of gaze, posture, dress, and body language. In the work about Kinesics done by Birdwhistell in 1970, there were two types of functions identified for non-verbal cues. One of the functions is directly related to the message that is being sent from one individual to another is concerned with the communication process and the integrational aspects.

The integrational activity includes the behavior that keeps the interaction in process, and the comprehensibility that goes in the exchange between individuals. Argyle, in 1969, identified the functions of six non-verbal cues and the role they play in the communications process. There are three that are integrational and three that are informational.

The integrational functions are:

1. Mutual attention and responsiveness: eye-gaze, head nods, and gestures.
2. Channel control: head nods and eye movements.
3. Feedback: This is mainly for the speaker to know how the audience is receiving the message.

The informational functions are:

1. Illustrations: Hand gestures to paint a picture or an object.
2. Emblems: Gestures being used instead of a word, like moving your head up and down to signify "yes."
3. Interpersonal attitudes: eye-gaze, gestures, proximity, and facial expressions.

=== Computer-mediated interactions ===
As computer-mediated communication has evolved, a more relational view of social presence has emerged. Social presence has come to be viewed as the way individuals represent themselves in their online environment. It's a personal stamp that indicates that the individual is available and willing to engage and connect with other persons in their online community. Social presence is demonstrated by the way messages are posted and how those messages are interpreted by others. Social presence defines how participants relate to one another, which in turn affects their ability to communicate effectively.

Social Presence Theory provides a foundation for communication systems designers and serves as a main principle in computer-mediated-communication studies. Gorham & Cristophel (1990), Tu & McIsaac (2002), and Aragon (2003) place high importance on using engagement tactics, in online classrooms, geared towards increasing social presence and reducing distance. These tactics include humanizing the interactions between instructor and students. Asynchronous (pre-produced content accessed individually by students on the web) and synchronous (real-time, simultaneous live connections of students together) components combined can enliven online interactions. Depending on the technology used, synchronous sessions can provide both audio and video connections, allowing an interchange involving both sight and sound, and all the rich nonverbal communication inherent in tone of voice and facial expressions. In a more recent study with distance learning, it is argued that distance learning works strictly to teach academic skill and that face-to-face learning teaches more well rounded skill. Author Jennifer J. Roberts' research discusses a blend of the two teaching mediums and their importance. Brian E. Mennecke, et al., examined how online mediums affect the communication between educators and their students. They discovered an absence of consistent social cues which resulted in their emphasizing a more personal approach to communicating, with added significance placed on the cultural perspectives of the students and how they communicate in an online environment.

Designers have accepted Social Presence Theory as a major design principle, to gain insight into user behavior when developing web-based applications and social computing technologies. They use social communication tools to enhance the student experience and to overcome the challenges of forming interpersonal relationships in a virtual space. Designers seek to provide a high-quality experience for the users by encouraging meaningful interactions between users and the development of interpersonal relationships. In a study conducted by Jahng and Littau in 2016, it was found that the importance we give to computer-mediated communications in order to trust the people we communicate with is reinforced. Their study describes how important it is for journalists to be active on social media in order to create a bond of trust with their audiences. Individuals do not feel comfortable when professionals are not as active on social platforms as is the established norm. Joshua Weidlich, et al., write that every medium can be identified by how genuine are the emotions that are felt by the receiver when the subject communicates emotions both verbally and non verbally.

Research related to the importance of social presence to the success of students points to the need to design social communication tools to enhance users' experience of one another. Social presence affects different aspects of a learner's experience, such as their "success (Russo & Benson, 2005; Zhan & Mei, 2013), satisfaction (Gunawardena & Zittle, 1997; Richardson & Swan, 2003; So & Brush, 2008; Zhan & Mei, 2013), and performance (Lomicka & Lord, 2007; Richardson & Swan, 2003)." A positive social presence enables students to engage with each other with ease, while a negative social presence has been shown to increase disappointment in users, which decreases cognition and familiarity with the material. Without social presence learning interaction suffers, which has negative effects on learning performance. Patrick Lowenthal discussed future trends in online learning with social presence theory in mind. He stated "researchers and practitioners alike will have to consider a new host of things related to social presence with the continued blurring of boundaries between classroom and fully online courses as well as between course bound communication tools (e.g., discussion forums) and non-course bound tools (e.g., Facebook and Twitter)...."

== Significance ==
Social presence is critical in improving instructional effectiveness in any setting, especially in distance education. In 2000–2001, Tu argued that within distance learning, social presence has three dimensions: social context, online communication, and interactivity. Social contexts contribute to a predictable degree of perceived social presence. Social contexts involve task orientation, privacy, topics, social relationships, and social process. As an example, when a conversation is task-based and public without a sense of community being in place, the perception of social presence is low and affective filtering (a communication blockage brought about by negative emotional feelings) is high. In addition, research sheds light on the relationship between a shared learning space and participants' satisfaction and encourages the building up of a shared learning space for a better e-learning environment.

Recent research highlights the importance of social presence in educational settings when delivering feedback on marked assessments.

== Measurement ==
There are three common forms of measuring social presence:

The Social Presence Scale (SPRES), created by Charlotte Gunawardena and Frank Zittle, consists of 14 Likert items to indicate users' perceived social presence.

The Social Presence and Privacy Questionnaire (SPPQ), designed by Chih-Hsiung Tu, distinguished social context, online communication, and interactivity based on a CMC attitude instrument and perceived privacy. However, Tu acknowledged that future work needs to improve the validity of the research.

Karel Kreijns, Paul A. Kirschner, Wim Jochems, and Hans van Buuren developed a self-reporting Social Presence Scale, consisting of five items:

No. Item	Item	M	SD	Factor Social Presence
1	When I have real-time conversations in this CSCL environment, I have my communication partner in my mind‟s eye	2.15	1.17	.80
2	When I have asynchronous conversations in this CSCL environment, I also have my communication partner in my mind‟s eye	2.75	1.16	.70
3	When I have real-time conversations in this CSCL environment, I feel that I deal with very real persons and not with abstract anonymous persons	2.90	1.50	.79
4	When I have asynchronous conversations in this CSCL environment, I also feel that I deal with very real persons and not with abstract anonymous persons	3.56	1.21	.79
5	Real-time conversations in this CSCL environment can hardly be distinguished from face-to-face conversations	1.81	1.01	.69

== Conclusion ==
In 1986, Steinfield found that task complexity, interdependence, uncertainty, and the perceived need to communicate over distances were positively associated with increasing online communication. In 1992, Walther argued that social relationships could stimulate changes in discourse as well. In examining text-based computer-mediated communication (e-mails) of conference participants, Walther discovered participants formed impressions of other participants from their communications. These impressions developed into visual interpretations of the other, and a sense of intimacy and identification between participants, which led to greater perception of social presence.

In 1991, Gunawardena argued that a purely text-based communication system (e-mail, discussion boards, and chat) rests upon the assumption that people using such a system have already developed a level of comfort with the technology that allows the person to effectively use it. Gunawardena argued further that text-based communications should account for not all users having a level of comfort in its use. Courses or conferences that rely heavily on such a system for communication should begin with light and casual conversation in areas that the user has familiarity with, which helps them in gaining a comfort level with the technology. Later work by Palloff and Pratt, in 1999 and 2003, validated Gunawardena's recommendation, and they called for establishing learning communities among online users at the very beginning of courses. In doing so, Palloff and Pratt argued that affective filters are lowered.

Interactivity involves the activities and communication styles that online users engage in. In 1986, Norton identified eleven communication styles that can be associated with online communications: impression-leaving, contentious, open, dramatic, dominant, precise, relaxed, friendly, attentive, animated, and image. What style participants use in communicating, especially the style teachers use, will impact social presence.

In their 2002 study on social presence, Tu and McIssac declared, "Social presence positively influences online instruction; however, frequency of participation does not represent high Social Presence". In both a quantitative and qualitative analysis of the interactions of 51 volunteers, Tu and McIssac found that social context was more qualitative (a learned skill-set rather than a prescriptive set of actions) to achieve positive impact, online communication was more strongly related to quantifiable and organizational skills of participants, and that interactivity constituted skill sets and communication styles used in combination. As a result, Tu and McIssac identified the following variables that had strong positive effects on the fueling or perception of social presence.

Variables Identified in Data from Tu and McIssac (2002)
	Dimensions		
Variables	I. Social Context	II. Online Communication	III. Interactivity
1	Familiarity with recipients	Keyboarding and accuracy skills	Timely Response
2	Assertive/Acquiescent	Use of emoticons and paralanguage	Communication Styles
3	Informal/formal	Characteristics of real-time discussion	Length of messages
4	Trust relationships	Characteristics of discussion boards	Formal/informal
5	Social relationships (love and information)	Language skills (writing and reading)	Type of tasks (planning, creativity, social tasks)
6	Psychological attitude toward technology		Size of groups
7	Access and location		Communication strategies
8	User characteristics		

While research in social presence is ongoing, researchers are confidently recommending designing online and e-format courses along the three dimensions that have been discussed. By building trust online, providing social "hand holding" support up front in any course using computer-mediated communication, and promoting informal relationships, teachers and instructors can provide a strong sense of social presence, increase a sense of community, and in turn increase interaction among participants.

== See also ==
- Communication theory
- Emotions in virtual communication
- Hyperpersonal model
- Media naturalness theory
- Social identity model of deindividuation effects (SIDE)
- Social information processing theory
- Computers are social actors
- Social translucence
- Theories of technology
- Kinesics
- The Naked Sun
- Group think
- Ederyn Williams
- Isaac Asimov
- Online Communication
- Michael Argyle
- Communication theory
- Multicommunicating
- Invitational rhetoric
- Social information processing theory
- Computers are social actors
- Computer-Mediated Communication
- Media Richness Theory
- Persuasion

== Sources ==
- Aragon, Steven R. (2003). "Creating social presence in online environments". New Directions for Adult and Continuing Education. 2003 (100): 57–68. doi:10.1002/ace.119. S2CID 144048026.
- Argyle, Michael; Dean, Janet (1965). "Eye-Contact, Distance and Affiliation". Sociometry. 28 (3): 289–304. doi:10.2307/2786027. JSTOR 2786027. PMID 14341239. S2CID 6791752.
- Argyle, M; Lalljee, M; Cook, M (1968). "The effects of visibility on interaction in the dyad". Human Relations. 21: 3–17. doi:10.1177/001872676802100101. S2CID 143613225.
- Argyle, M (1969). Social Interaction. London: Methuen.
- Biocca, Frank; Harms, Chad; Burgoon, Judee K. (2003). "Toward a More Robust Theory and Measure of Social Presence: Review and Suggested Criteria". Presence: Teleoperators and Virtual Environments. 12 (5): 456–480. doi:10.1162/105474603322761270. S2CID 34210666.
- Birdwhistell, R.L. (1970). Kinesics and Context. Philadelphia: University of Philadelphia Press.
- Lu, Baozhou; Fan, Weiguo; Zhou, Mi (2016). "Social presence, trust, and social commerce purchase intention: An empirical research". Computers in Human Behavior. 56: 225–237. doi:10.1016/j.chb.2015.11.057.
- Burgoon, Judee K.; Buller, David B.; Hale, Jerold L.; Turck, Mark A. (1984). "Relational Messages Associated with Nonverbal Behaviors". Human Communication Research. 10 (3): 351–378. doi:10.1111/j.1468-2958.1984.tb00023.x.
- Cobb, S. C. (2009). "Social Presence and Online Learning: A Current View from a Research Perspective" (PDF). Journal of Interactive Online Learning. 8 (3): 241.
- Dixson, Marcia D.; Greenwell, Mackenzie R.; Rogers-Stacy, Christie; Weister, Tyson; Lauer, Sara (2017). "Nonverbal immediacy behaviors and online student engagement: Bringing past instructional research into the present virtual classroom". Communication Education. 66: 37–53. doi:10.1080/03634523.2016.1209222. S2CID 151596209.
- Gorham, Joan; Christophel, Diane M. (1990). "The relationship of teachers' use of humor in the classroom to immediacy and student learning". Communication Education. 39: 46–62. doi:10.1080/03634529009378786.
- Gunawardena, Charlotte N. (1995). "Social Presence Theory and Implications for Interaction and Collaborative Learning in Computer Conferences". International Journal of Educational Telecommunications. 1 (2): 147–166.
- Gunawardena, Charlotte N.; Zittle, Frank J. (1997). "Social presence as a predictor of satisfaction within a computer-mediated conferencing environment". American Journal of Distance Education. 11 (3): 8–26. doi:10.1080/08923649709526970.
- Jahng, Mi Rosie; Littau, Jeremy (2016). "Interacting is Believing". Journalism & Mass Communication Quarterly. 93: 38–58. doi:10.1177/1077699015606680. S2CID 147467235.
- Kehrwald, Benjamin (2008). "Understanding social presence in text-based online learning environments". Distance Education. 29: 89–106. doi:10.1080/01587910802004860. S2CID 145402355.
- Kendall, Julie E.; Kendall, Kenneth E. (2017). "Enhancing Online Executive Education Using Storytelling: An Approach to Strengthening Online Social Presence". Decision Sciences Journal of Innovative Education. 15: 62–81. doi:10.1111/dsji.12121.
- Kiliç Çakmak, Ebru; Çebi, Ayça; Kan, Adnan (2014). "Developing a "Social Presence Scale" for E-learning Environments". Educational Sciences: Theory & Practice. 14 (2): 764–768. doi:10.12738/estp.2014.2.1847.
- Kim, Jihyun; Song, Hayeon; Lee, Sanguk (2018). "Extrovert and Lonely Individuals' Social TV Viewing Experiences: A Mediating and Moderating Role of Social Presence". Mass Communication and Society. 21: 50–70. doi:10.1080/15205436.2017.1350715. S2CID 148886826.
- Stapa, Siti Hamin; Maros, Marlyna; Krish, Pramela (9 January 2012). "Sociocultural Factors and Social Presence in an Online Learning Environment". GEMA Online Journal of Language Studies. 12 (1).
- Lamendola, Walter (2010). "Social Work and Social Presence in an Online World". Journal of Technology in Human Services. 28 (1–2): 108–119. doi:10.1080/15228831003759562. S2CID 143540765.
- Lee, Kwan Min (2004). "Presence, Explicated". Communication Theory. 14: 27–50. doi:10.1111/j.1468-2885.2004.tb00302.x.
- Lombard, Matthew; Ditton, Theresa (2006). "At the Heart of It All: The Concept of Presence". Journal of Computer-Mediated Communication. 3 (2). doi:10.1111/j.1083-6101.1997.tb00072.x.
- Lomicka, Lara; Lord, Gillian (2007). "Social presence in virtual communities of foreign language (FL) teachers". System. 35 (2): 208–228. doi:10.1016/j.system.2006.11.002.
- Norton, Robert W. (1986). "Communicator style in teaching: Giving good form to content". New Directions for Teaching and Learning. 1986 (26): 33–40. doi:10.1002/tl.37219862606.
- Osei-Frimpong, Kofi; McLean, Graeme (2018). "Examining online social brand engagement: A social presence theory perspective" (PDF). Technological Forecasting and Social Change. 128: 10–21. doi:10.1016/j.techfore.2017.10.010.
- Palloff, R. M., Pratt, K. (1999). Building learning communities in cyberspace: Effective strategies for the online classroom. San Francisco: Jossey-Bass.
- Palloff, R. M., Pratt, K. (2003). The virtual student. San Francisco: Jossey-Bass.
- Rice, Ronald E. (1993). "Media Appropriateness". Human Communication Research. 19 (4): 451–484. doi:10.1111/j.1468-2958.1993.tb00309.x.
- Richardson, Jennifer C.; Swan, Karen (2019). "Examining Social Presence in Online Courses in Relation to Students' Perceived Learning and Satisfaction" (PDF). Online Learning. 7. doi:10.24059/olj.v7i1.1864.
- Roberts, J. J. (2019). Online learning as a form of distance education : linking formation learning in theology to the theories of distance education. Hts : Theological Studies, 75(1), 1–9. https://doi.org/10.4102/hts.v75i1.5345.
- Russo, Tracy; Benson, Spencer (2005). "Learning with Invisible Others: Perceptions of Online Presence and their Relationship to Cognitive and Affective Learning" (PDF). Journal of Educational Technology & Society. 8 (1): 54–62. JSTOR jeductechsoci.8.1.54.
- Sallnäs, Eva-Lotta; Rassmus-Gröhn, Kirsten; Sjöström, Calle (2000). "Supporting presence in collaborative environments by haptic force feedback". ACM Transactions on Computer-Human Interaction. 7 (4): 461–476. doi:10.1145/365058.365086. S2CID 6632654.
- Services, A. T. (2018, September 27). Social Presence Theory (PDF) . Retrieved from Memorial Library.
- Shen, Kathy Ning; Khalifa, Mohamed (2008). "Exploring Multidimensional Conceptualization of Social Presence in the Context of Online Communities". International Journal of Human-Computer Interaction. 24 (7): 722–748. doi:10.1080/10447310802335789. S2CID 20952910.
- Shen, Kathy Ning; Yu, Angela Yan; Khalifa, Mohamed. "Knowledge Contribution in Virtual Communities: Accounting for Multiple Dimensions of Social Presence through Social Identity". PACIS 2007 Proceedings. 98. CiteSeerX 10.1.1.149.3188.
- Short, J. A., Williams, E., & Christie, B. (1976). The social psychology of telecommunications. London: Wiley.
- So, Hyo-Jeong; Brush, Thomas A. (2008). "Student perceptions of collaborative learning, social presence and satisfaction in a blended learning environment: Relationships and critical factors". Computers & Education. 51: 318–336. doi:10.1016/j.compedu.2007.05.009. S2CID 14292272.
- Steinfield, Charles W. (1986). "Computer-Mediated Communication in an Organizational Setting: Explaining Task-Related and Socioemotional Uses". Annals of the International Communication Association. 9: 777–804. doi:10.1080/23808985.1986.11678637.
- Tu, Chih-Hsiung (2000). "On-line learning migration: From social learning theory to social presence theory in a CMC environment". Journal of Network and Computer Applications. 23: 27–37. doi:10.1006/jnca.1999.0099.
- Tu, Chih-Hsiung (2001). "How Chinese Perceive Social Presence: An Examination of Interaction in Online Learning Environment". Educational Media International. 38: 45–60. doi:10.1080/09523980010021235. S2CID 143947023.
- Tu, Chih-Hsiung; McIsaac, Marina (2002). "The Relationship of Social Presence and Interaction in Online Classes". American Journal of Distance Education. 16 (3): 131–150. doi:10.1207/S15389286AJDE1603_2. S2CID 54826974.
- Turner, Jeanine Warisse; Foss, Sonja K. (2018). "Options for the Construction of Attentional Social Presence in a Digitally Enhanced Multicommunicative Environment". Communication Theory. 28: 22–45. doi:10.1093/ct/qty002.
- Walther, Joseph B. (1992). "Interpersonal Effects in Computer-Mediated Interaction" (PDF). Communication Research. 19: 52–90. doi:10.1177/009365092019001003. S2CID 145557658.
- Wei, Chun-Wang; Chen, Nian-Shing; Kinshuk (2012). "A model for social presence in online classrooms". Educational Technology Research and Development. 60 (3): 529–545. doi:10.1007/s11423-012-9234-9. S2CID 145286710.
- Wei, Jie; Seedorf, Stefan; Lowry, Paul Benjamin; Thum, Christian; Schulze, Thimo (2017). "How increased social presence through co-browsing influences user engagement in collaborative online shopping". Electronic Commerce Research and Applications. 24: 84–99. doi:10.1016/j.elerap.2017.07.002. hdl:10722/245387.
- Westerman, David; Spence, Patric R.; Lin, Xialing (2015). "Telepresence and Exemplification in Health Messages: The Relationships among Spatial and Social Presence and Exemplars and Exemplification Effects". Communication Reports. 28 (2): 92–102. doi:10.1080/08934215.2014.971838. S2CID 143363105.
- Wiener, M., & Mehrabain, A. (1968). Language within language: Immediacy, a channel in verbal communication. New York; Appleton-Century-Crofts.
- Zhan, Zehui; Mei, Hu (2013). "Academic self-concept and social presence in face-to-face and online learning: Perceptions and effects on students' learning achievement and satisfaction across environments". Computers & Education. 69: 131–138. doi:10.1016/j.compedu.2013.07.002.
