= International Journal of e-Collaboration =

- Discipline: Computer-human interaction, computer-supported cooperative work, electronic commerce
- Language: English
- Edited by: Mehdi Khosrow-Pour

Publication details
- History: 2005–present
- Publisher: IGI Global
- Frequency: Quarterly

Standard abbreviations
- ISO 4: Int. J. e-Collab.

Indexing
- ISSN: 1548-3673 (print); 1548-3681 (web)
- LCCN: 2004212069
- OCLC no.: 423709794

Links
- Journal homepage

The International Journal of e-Collaboration is a quarterly peer-reviewed academic journal that covers the field of e-collaboration at the intersection of human-computer interaction, computer-supported cooperative work, and electronic commerce. It was established in 2005 and is published by IGI Global.

== Editors ==
The following persons have been editors-in-chief:

- 2004–2017: founding editor: Ned Kock (Texas A&M International University)
- 2017–present: Jingyuan Zhao (University of Toronto)

== Abstracting and indexing ==
The journal is abstracted and indexed in the ACM Digital Library, Inspec, PsycINFO, and Scopus.
