= Richard L. Daft =

Business management researcher

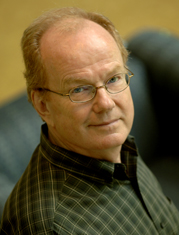
- Born: 1941 (age 84–85); Nebraska

Academic background
- Education: University of Nebraska; University of Chicago
- Thesis: The process of organizational innovation: an empirical study of thirteen high school districts (1974)
- Doctoral advisor: Selwyn Becker

Richard L. Daft (born 1941) is an American organizational theorist and the Brownlee O. Currey, Jr. Professor of Management at the Owen Graduate School of Management, Vanderbilt University.

== Biography ==
Daft holds a B.S. from the University of Nebraska, an M.B.A. from the University of Chicago, and a Ph.D. from the University of Chicago.

He has made fundamental contributions to the study of organization behavior and organization design, and authored several books in these areas. He co-developed media richness theory, with Robert H. Lengel, and is one of the most widely cited scholars in the field of management.

He developed and managed the Center for Change Leadership at the Owen Graduate School of Management, Vanderbilt University, where he also served as Associate Dean for Academic Programs. He is a Fellow of the Academy of Management.

== Bibliography ==
- Leadership (2011)
- Leadership and Management (2010)
- The Executive and the Elephant (2010)
- Management: The New Workplace (2009)
- Principles of Management (2009)
- Understanding the Theory and Design of Organizations (2007)
- Daft, Richard L.; Lane, Patricia G. (2023). The Leadership Experience (8th ed.). Cengage Learning. ISBN 9780357716304. OCLC 1343203562.
- Organizational Behaviors (2001)
- Talking about Organization (2000)
- Fusion Leadership (1998)
- Where Are the Theories for the "New" Organizational Forms? An Editorial Essay (1993) with Arie Lewin
- Management (1988), The Dryden Press
