= Theories of technology =

Factors that shape technological innovation

Theories of technological change and innovation attempt to explain the factors that shape technological innovation as well as the impact of technology on society and culture. Some of the most contemporary theories of technological change reject two of the previous views: the linear model of technological innovation and other, the technological determinism. To challenge the linear model, some of today's theories of technological change and innovation point to the history of technology, where they find evidence that technological innovation often gives rise to new scientific fields, and emphasizes the important role that social networks and cultural values play in creating and shaping technological artifacts. To challenge the so-called "technological determinism", today's theories of technological change emphasize the scope of the need of technical choice, which they find to be greater than most laypeople can realize; as scientists in philosophy of science, and further science and technology often like to say about this "It could have been different." For this reason, theorists who take these positions often argue that a greater public involvement in technological decision-making is desired.

== Sociological theories ==
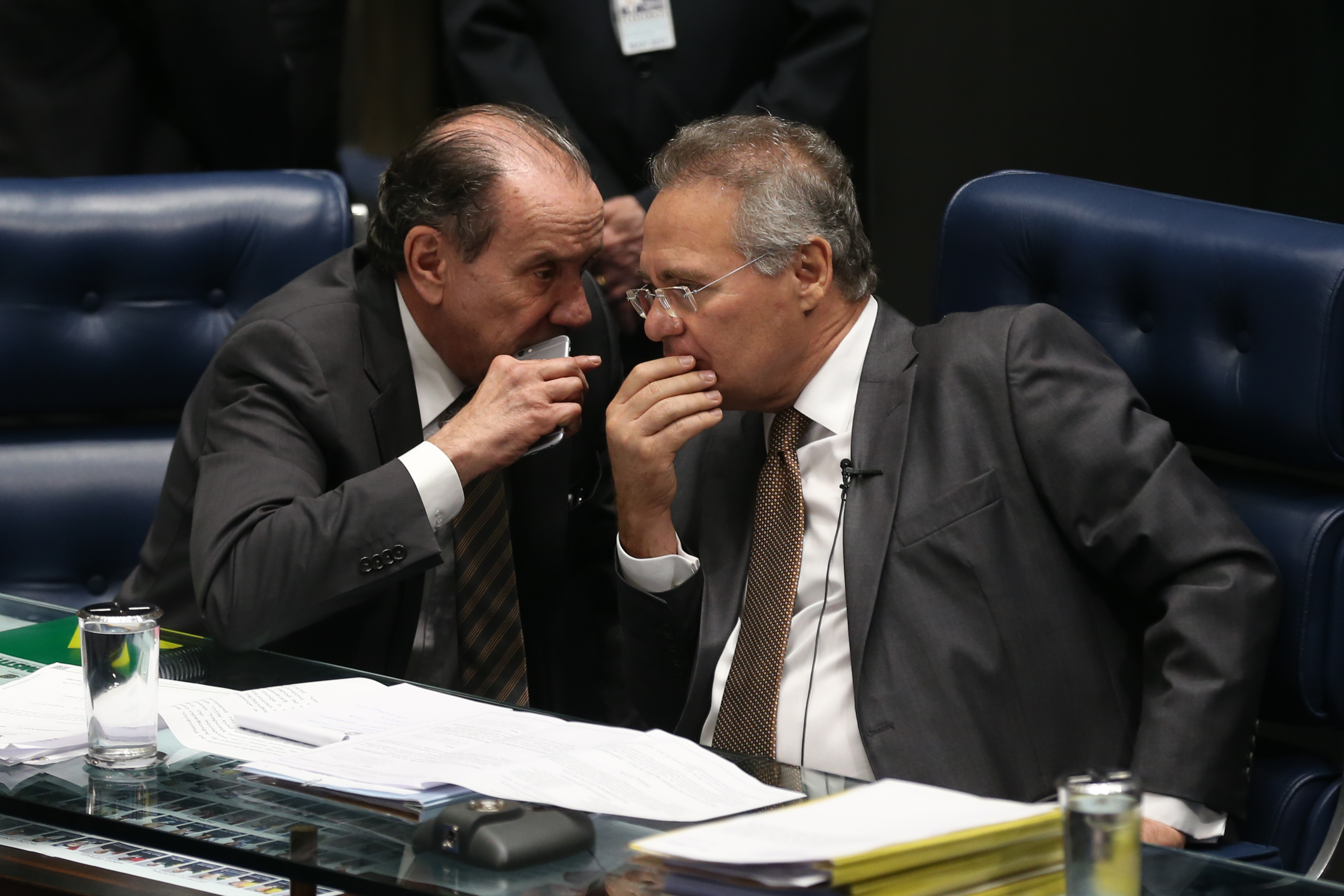
Politics and technology

Sociological theories and researches of the Society and the Social focus on how human and technology actually interact and may even affect each other. Some theories are about how political decisions are made for both humans and technology, with here humans and technology are seen as an equal field in the political decision, where humans also make, use, and even move ahead with innovations the technology. The interactions that are used in the majority of the theories on this topic look at the individual human interactions with technological equipment, but there is also a sub-group for the group of people interacting with technology. The theories described are, according to some critiques, purposefully made vague and ambiguous, as the circumstances for the theories change with human culture and technological change and innovation.

=== Descriptive approaches ===
Social constructivism and technology argues that technology may not determine the human action, but human action may shape technological use. Key concepts here include:

- interpretive flexibility: "Technological artifacts are culturally constructed and interpreted ... By this, we mean not only is there flexibility in how people think of or interpret artifacts but also there is flexibility in how artifacts are designed." And so the technological artifacts may determine and shape what that specific technology tool will symbolize and represent in society or in a culture. This is in relation to the Social constructivism and technology theory because it shows how humans symbolize technology, by shaping it.
- Relevant social group shares a particular set of meanings about a given artifact
- Economical stabilization is often about when the relevant social group has reached a consensus, according to technological change and innovation criticism
- Wider context: "the sociocultural and political situation of a social group shapes its norms and values, which in turn influence the meaning given to an artifact"

Key authors here include MacKenzie and Wajcman (1985).

- Actor-network theory (ANT) is about a heterogeneous network of humans and even non-humans as equal interrelated actors. It strives for impartiality in the description of human actors and nonhuman technological gadgets, and the reintegration of the natural world and the society. For example, Latour (1992) argues that instead of worrying whether we are making anthropomorphological the technology, and we should embrace it as inherently anthropomorphic as technology is after all made by humans, and substitutes for the actions of humans, and therefore shapes the human action.

What is important is the gradients and the connectivity of actors' actions and their technological competencies, and also the degree to which we choose to have "figurative" representations. Key concepts here include the inscription of beliefs, practices, relations into technology, which is then said to embody them. Key authors include Bruno Latour (1997) and Callon (1999).

- Structuration theory attempts to define the structures also as resources and their rules that are organized with relevant technological system properties at the social level. The theory employs one recursive notion of actions, constrained and enabled by structures which are produced and reproduced by the action. Consequently, in this theory technology can not be rendered as an artifact, so instead examines people and their interacion with technology at their work practices, that enacts structures which shape their emerging and also situated use of that technology. Here, key authors include DeSanctis and Poole (1990), and Orlikowski (1992).
- Systems theory considers the historical development of technology and media with an emphasis on inertia and heterogeneity, stressing the connections between the artifact being built and the social, economic, political and cultural factors surrounding it. Key concepts include reverse salients when elements of a system lag in development with respect to others, differentiation, operational closure, and autopoietic autonomy. Key authors include Thomas P. Hughes (1992) and Luhmann (2000).
- Activity theory is considering that entire work and also activity system (including included members, teams, organizations, etc.) beyond one user or actor. It also may account for the environment, personal history and supposed culture, "the role of the artifacts", emerged motivations, and sought views on complexity of activities in real-life. One of the strengths of AT is that it bridges the gap between the individual subject and the social reality—it studies both through the mediating activity. The unit of analysis in AT is the concept of object-oriented, collective and culturally mediated human activity, or activity system.

=== Approaches of the critical theory ===
Critical theory attempts, according to some, to go beyond the descriptiveness of one account that may show of how things are, the exam and question of why they have come to be that way and how they might otherwise be. Critical theory asks whose interests are being served by the questioned status quo and assesses the potentials of a future, that alternates and propose "to better" both the technological service, and even social justice. Here Geuss's definition is given, where "a critical theory, then, is a reflective theory which gives agents a kind of knowledge inherently productive of enlightenment and emancipation" (1964). Thus Marcuse argued that while technology matters and design are often presented as neutral technical choices, in fact, they manifest political or moral values. Critical theory is seen as a "form of archaeology" that attempt to get beneath common-sense understandings in order to reveal the power relationships and interests determining particular technological configuration and use.

Perhaps the most developed contemporary critical theory of technology is contained in the works of Andrew Feenberg included in his book 'Transforming Technology' (2002).

- Values in Design asks how do we ensure a place for values (alongside technical standards such as speed, efficiency, and reliability) as criteria by which we judge the quality and acceptability of information systems and new media. How do values such as privacy, autonomy, democracy, and social justice become integral to conception, design, and development, not merely retrofitted after completion? Key thinkers include Helen Nissenbaum (2001).

=== Social Group Theories ===
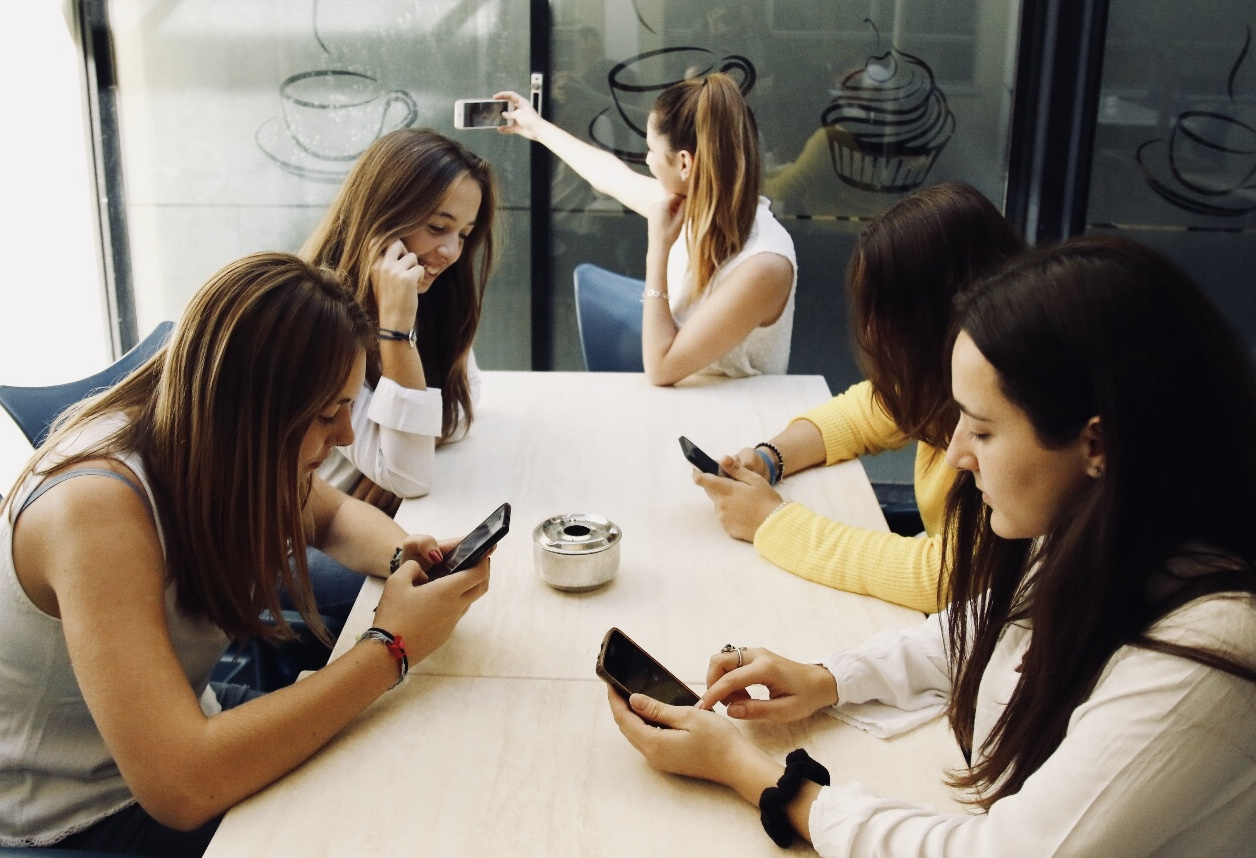
Society and Technology. According to the proponents of biological social theories the main topic here is: Who dominates Whom?

There are also a number of technologically related science and society theories that also address even on how media affects group developments or otherwise processes. Broadly speaking, these technological theories are said to be concerned with the social effects of communication media (e.g., media richness) are concerned with questions of media choice (when to use what medium effectively). Other theories (social presence and "media naturalness") are concerned with the consequences of those media choices (i.e., what are the social effects of using particular communication media).

- Social presence theory (Short, et al., 1976) is a "seminal theory" of the viewed social effects of communications technology. And its main concern is, naturally, with telephony and telephone, but also even conferencing (and the research here was found among the sponsored by the General Post Office, now British Telecom). It argues that the social impact of a communication medium depend on the social presence it allows communicators to have. Social presence is defined as a property of the medium itself: the degree of acoustic, visual, and physical contact that it allows. The theory assumes that more contact will increase the key components of "presence": greater intimacy, immediacy, warmth and inter-personal rapport. As a consequence of social presence, social influence is expected to increase. In the case of communication technology, the assumption is that more text-based forms of interaction (e-mail, instant messaging) are less social, and therefore less conducive to social influence.
- Media richness theory (Daft & Lengel, 1986) shares some characteristics with social presence theory. It posits that the amount of information communicated differs with respect to a medium's richness. The theory assumes that resolving ambiguity and reducing uncertainty are the main goals of communication. Because communication media differ in the rate of understanding they can achieve in a specific time (with "rich" media carrying more information), they are not all capable of resolving uncertainty and ambiguity well. The more restricted the medium's capacity, the less uncertainty and equivocality it is able to manage. It follows that the richness of the media should be matched to the task so as to prevent over simplification or complication.
- Media naturalness theory (Kock, 2001; 2004) builds on human evolution ideas and has been proposed as an alternative to media richness theory. Media naturalness theory argues that since our Stone Age hominid ancestors have communicated primarily face-to-face, evolutionary pressures have led to the development of a brain that is consequently designed for that form of communication. Other forms of communication are too recent and unlikely to have posed evolutionary pressures that could have shaped our brain in their direction. Using communication media that suppress key elements found in face-to-face communication, as many electronic communication media do, thus ends up posing cognitive obstacles to communication. This is particularly the case in the context of complex tasks (e.g., business process redesign, new product development, online learning), because such tasks seem to require more intense communication over extended periods of time than simple tasks.

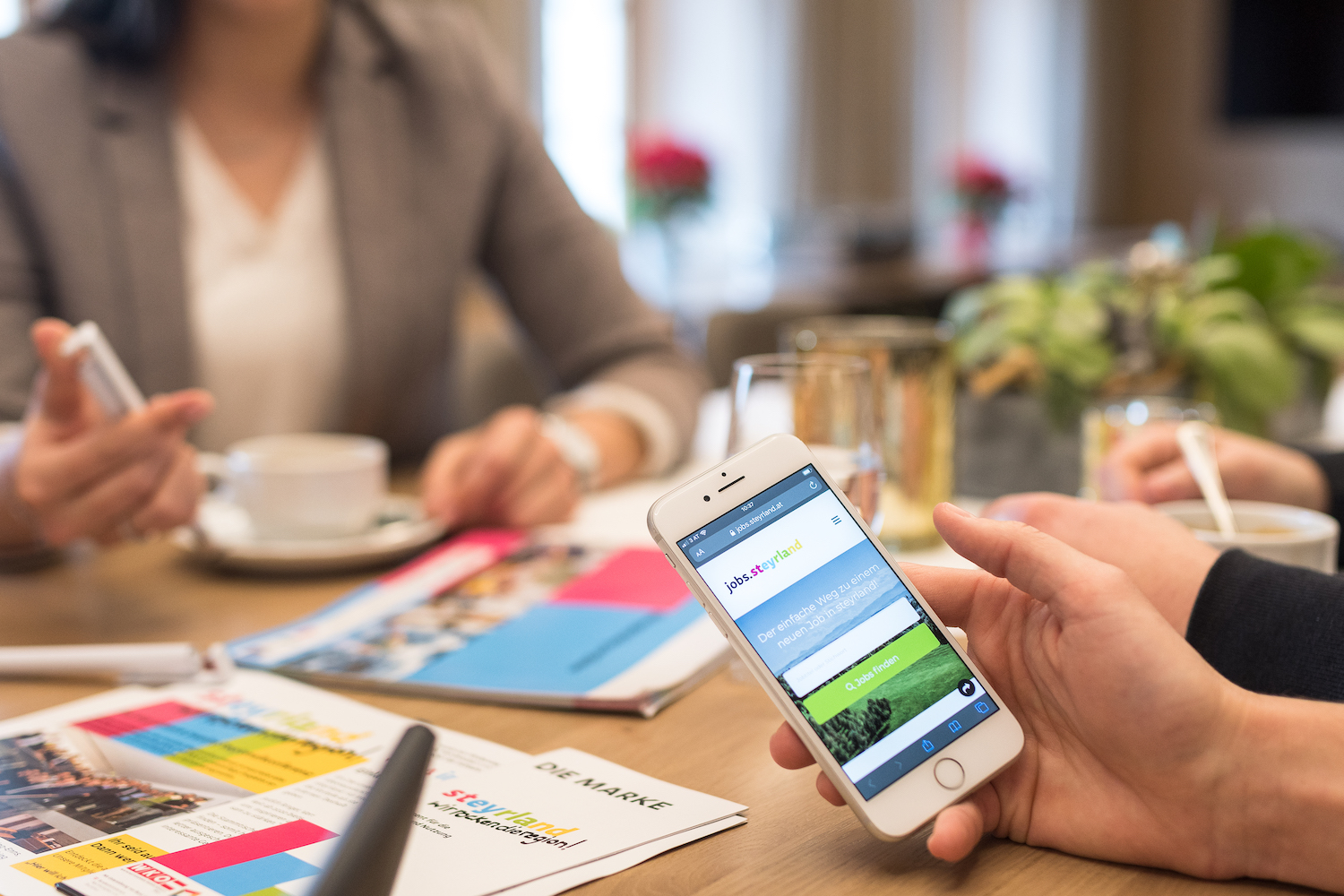
Modernt work websites and HRs use technological synchronicity

- Media synchronicity theory (MST, Dennis & Valacich, 1999) redirects richness theory towards the synchronicity of the communication.
- The social identity model of deindividuation effects (SIDE) (Postmes, Spears and Lea 1999; Reicher, Spears and Postmes, 1995; Spears & Lea, 1994) was developed as a response to the idea that anonymity and reduced presence made communication technology socially impoverished (or "deindividuated"). It provided an alternative explanation for these "deindividuation effects" based on theories of social identity (e.g., Turner et al., 1987). The SIDE model distinguishes cognitive and strategic effects of a communication technology. Cognitive effects occur when communication technologies make "salient" particular aspects of personal or social identity. For example, certain technologies such as email may disguise characteristics of the sender that individually differentiate them (i.e., that convey aspects of their personal identity) and as a result more attention may be given to their social identity. The strategic effects are due to the possibilities, afforded by communication technology, to selectively communicate or enact particular aspects of identity, and disguise others. SIDE therefore sees the social and the technological as mutually determining, and the behavior associated with particular communication forms as the product or interaction of the two.
- Time, interaction, and performance (TIP; McGrath, 1991) theory describes work groups as time-based, multi-modal, and multi-functional social systems. Groups interact in one of the modes of inception, problem solving, conflict resolution, and execution. The three functions of a group are production (towards a goal), support (affective) and well-being (norms and roles).

=== Other Stances ===
Additionally, many authors have posed technology so as to critique and or emphasize aspects of technology as addressed by the mainline theories. For example, Steve Woolgar (1991) considers technology as text in order to critique the sociology of scientific knowledge as applied to technology and to distinguish between three responses to that notion: the instrumental response (interpretive flexibility), the interpretivist response (environmental/organizational influences), the reflexive response (a double hermeneutic). Pfaffenberger (1992) treats technology as drama to argue that a recursive structuring of technological artifacts and their social structure discursively regulate the technological construction of political power. A technological drama is a discourse of technological "statements" and "counterstatements" within the processes of technological regularization, adjustment, and reconstitution.

An important philosophical approach to technology has been taken by Bernard Stiegler, whose work has been influenced by other philosophers and historians of technology including Gilbert Simondon and André Leroi-Gourhan. In the Schumpeterian and Neo-Schumpeterian theories technologies are critical factors of economic growth (Carlota Perez).

== Analytical theories ==
There are theories of technological change and innovation which are not defined or claimed by a proponent, but are used by authors in describing existing literature, in contrast to their own or as a review of the field.

For example, Markus and Robey (1988) propose a general technology theory consisting of the causal structures of agency (technological, organizational, imperative, emergent), its structure (variance, process), and the level (micro, macro) of analysis.

Orlikowski (1992) notes that previous conceptualizations of technology typically differ over scope (is technology more than hardware?) and role (is it an external objective force, the interpreted human action, or an impact moderated by humans?) and identifies three models:

1. The technological imperative: focuses on organizational characteristics which can be measured and permits some level of contingency
2. Strategic choices: focuses on how technology is influenced by the context and strategies of decision-makers and users
3. Technology as maker of structural changes:: views technology as a social object

DeSanctis and Poole (1994) similarly write of three views of technology's effects:

1. Decision-making: the view of engineers associated with positivist, rational, systems rationalization, and deterministic approaches
2. Institutional school: technology is an opportunity for change, focuses on social evolution, social construction of meaning, interaction and historical processes, interpretive flexibility, and an interplay between technology and power
3. An integrated perspective (social technology): soft-line determinism, with joint social and technological optimization, structural symbolic interaction theory

Bimber (1998) addresses the determinacy of technology effects by distinguishing between the:

1. Normative: an autonomous approach where technology is an important influence on history only where societies attached cultural and political meaning to it (e.g., the industrialization of society)
2. Nomological: a naturalistic approach wherein an inevitable technological order arises based on laws of nature (e.g., steam mill had to follow the hand mill)
3. Unintended consequences: a fuzzy approach that is demonstrative that technology is contingent (e.g., a car is faster than a horse, but unbeknownst to its original creators become a significant source of pollution)

== Bibliography ==
- Bentley, Raymond (2019). Technological Change In The German Democratic Republic, Routledge
- Denis, A. and Valacich, J. (1999). Rethinking media richness: towards a theory of media synchronicity. Proceedings of the 32nd Hawaii International Conference on Systems Science.
- Desanctis, G. and Poole, M. S. (1990). 'Understanding the use of group decision support systems: the theory of adaptive structuration'. In J. Fulk, C. S., editor, Organizations and Communication Technology, pages 173–193. Sage, Newbury Park, CA.
- MacKenzie, D. and Wajcman, J. (1985) The Social Shaping of Technology, Milton Keynes, Open University Press.
- Pinch, T. and Bijker, W. (1992). 'The social construction of facts and artifacts: or how the sociology of science and the sociology of technology might benefit each other'. In Bijker, W. and Law, J., editors, Shaping Technology/Building Society, pages 17–50. MIT Press, Cambridge, MA.
