= Ramp (company) =

American financial technology company

Ramp Business Corporation
- Type: Private
- Industry: Fintech
- Founded: March 2019; 7 years ago
- Founders: Eric Glyman (CEO); Karim Atiyeh (CTO); Gene Lee
- Headquarters: New York City, United States
- Products: Corporate expense management platform, corporate credit cards
- Revenue: US$1.0 billion (2025)
- Number of employees: 1,200 (2025)
- Website: ramp.com

Ramp Business Corporation is an American multinational financial technology company that offers corporate charge cards, expense management, and bill-payment software. The company is headquartered in New York City with additional offices in Miami and San Francisco.

As of June 2026, Ramp was valued at $44 billion with $1 billion in annualized revenue.

== History ==
=== Founding ===
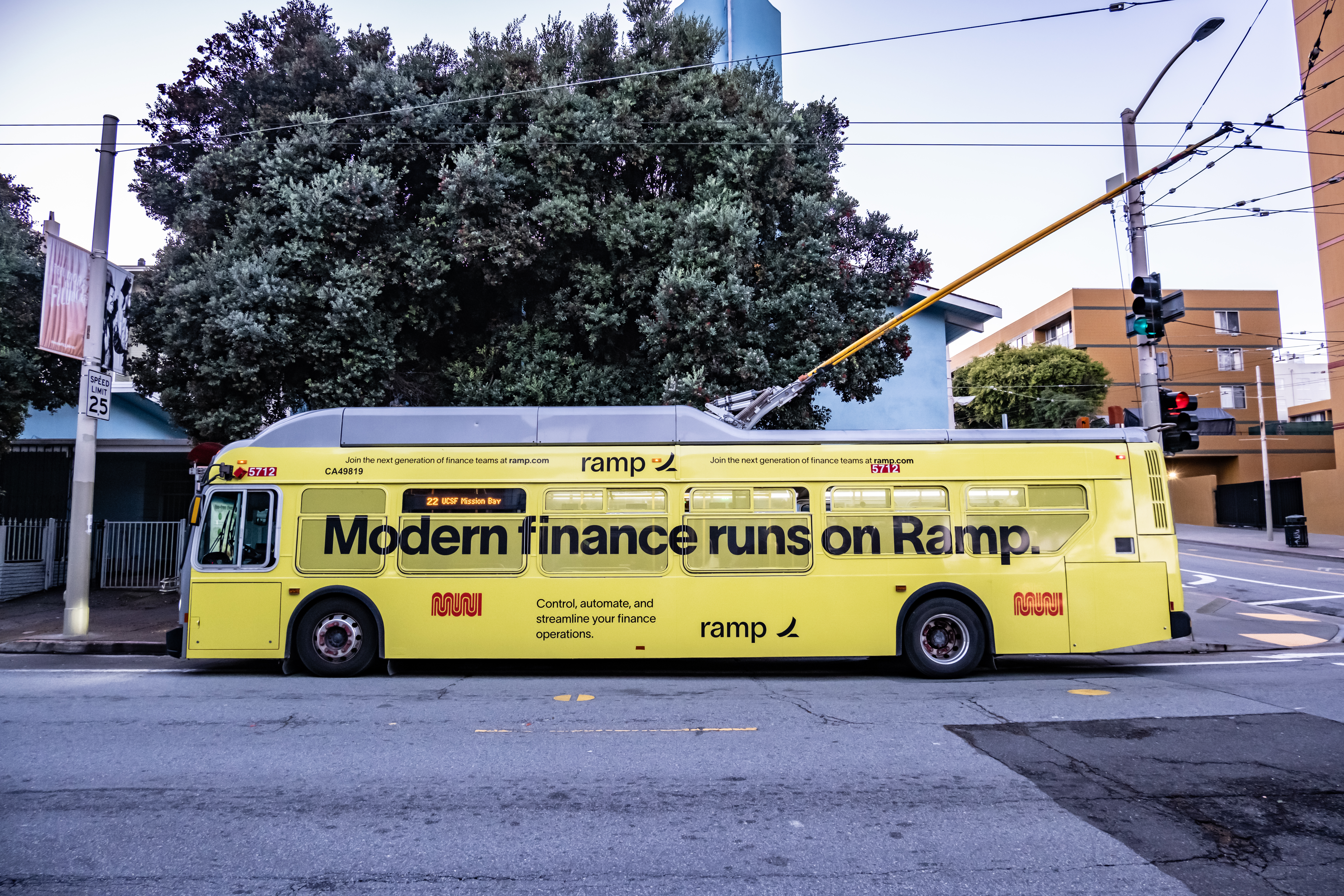
Ramp advertisement on a San Francisco MUNI bus

Ramp was founded in March 2019 by Eric Glyman, Karim Atiyeh, and Gene Lee. Glyman and Atiyeh met as classmates at Harvard University and had previously founded the price tracking app Paribus, which was acquired by Capital One in 2016. Glyman and Atiyeh talked with approximately 100 finance experts before launching Ramp's corporate card, finding that potential clients were unhappy with the inefficiency of existing methods for collecting receipts and logging expenses.

The company was formally launched in February 2020, with Atiyeh as its chief technology officer and Glyman as chief executive officer. Ramp completed an early institutional round of financing that same month when it raised about $15 million in a Series A led by Founders Fund. By December, Ramp raised an additional $30 million in follow-on financing.

=== Expansion and growth ===
Within two years of its founding, the company became the fastest New York startup to reach unicorn status. Ramp closed a $115 million Series B funding round in April 2021 placing its valuation at $1.6 billion. In August 2021, the company raised $300 million in a Series C round, which increased its valuation to roughly $3.9 billion. Ramp was valued at $8.1 billion and reached $100 million in annualized revenue by early 2022.

In August 2023, Ramp raised $300 million in a Series D round and had a valuation of $5.8 billion. That same month, Ramp announced that it was expanding into the procurement space, handling purchase requests, vendor management, and intake workflows.

As of 2024, Ramp had reached $300 million in annualized revenue with more than 25,000 businesses on its platform. That June, it secured $150 million in a Series D-2 funding round, reaching a valuation of $7.65 billion.

=== Recent developments ===
That same month, Ramp published a blog post titled "The Efficiency Formula" discussing potential applications of its technology to government spending. The General Services Administration later announced a pilot program related to the government's SmartPay expense card program, for which Ramp confirmed it was being considered. The commissioner of the Federal Acquisition Service helped organize private meetings with Ramp executives.

In March 2025, Ramp's valuation increased to $13 billion, almost double over a year prior. Ramp was valued at $16 billion after a June 2025 Series E funding round and at $22.5 billion the next month. The company introduced AI Policy Agent, a tool that applies company expense policies to transactions using artificial intelligence to automate expense reviews and approvals, in the summer of 2025. As of August 2025, Ramp had reached $1 billion in annualized revenue.

By November 2025, Ramp's valuation further increased to $32 billion after a $300 million primary financing round and an employee tender offer. The round was led by Lightspeed Venture Partners with new investors such as Bessemer Venture Partners and 1789 Capital.

In June 2026, Ramp raised $750 million in a funding round led by ICONIQ Growth, GIC, and the Ontario Teachers' Pension Plan, at a $44 billion valuation. In October 2026, Ramp raised $1.85 billion in a funding round valuing the company at $60 billion, while reporting annualized revenue exceeding $2 billion.

== Recognition ==
In 2024 and 2025, Ramp was one of CNBC's Disruptor 50. The company was included on the Forbes "Cloud 100" list for 2024 and 2025. It has been recognized on Fast Company's "Most Innovative Companies" of 2023 and 2024 lists.
