= Kevin Drum =

American journalist (1958–2025)

- Born: October 19, 1958; Long Beach, California, U.S.
- Died: March 7, 2025 (aged 66)
- Education: California State University, Long Beach
- Occupation: Journalist

Kevin Drum (October 19, 1958 – March 7, 2025) was an American journalist. Drum initially rose to prominence through the popularity of his independent blog Calpundit (2003–2004). He later was invited to launch another blog, Political Animal (2004–2008), for the Washington Monthly. He held a writing and blogging position at Mother Jones from 2008 to 2021, before returning to independence with his Jabberwocking blog.

== Early life and education ==
Drum was born in Long Beach, California, on October 19, 1958, the son of Jean (Holliger) and Dale Drum, a professor of speech and film history at Cal State. He graduated from Pacifica High School in Garden Grove, California, and then attended Caltech for two years before transferring to California State University, Long Beach, where he received his bachelor's degree in journalism in 1981. While at CSULB, he served as city editor of the university's student run newspaper, The Daily 49er.

== Career ==
=== Technology ===
After graduating from college, Drum worked at RadioShack for several years, and became a store manager in Costa Mesa, California, in 1983. He subsequently got a technical-writing job with a local technology company, becoming a product manager at Emulex. In 1992, he began working at Kofax Image Products, an Irvine, California-based supplier of application software and image processing products. In 2000 he was promoted from the position of VP for Marketing, becoming the general manager of the Ascent Software Business Unit within Kofax. In 2001, he moved to newly created position with Dicom New Ventures, the business development arm of the Dicom Group, Kofax's parent company. He quit in 2002 to become a marketing consultant; he gave that up in 2004 to concentrate full-time on writing.

=== Blogging ===
Drum's blogging started in 2001, part-time; in late 2002 he started his independent blog Calpundit. On one Friday in March, he posted a photo of his cat Inkblot as an antidote to stressful politics, thus inventing Friday cat blogging, a practice that was soon adopted by many blogs. The Washington Monthly, which wanted a blog, hired Drum in 2004 to launch Political Animal. In 2008 he was hired to write and blog at Mother Jones. In 2021, he returned to independent blogging at his site Jabberwocking.

Drum tended toward wry skepticism about dramatic press stories, often deflating sensational headlines with statistics that showed historical continuity rather than any noteworthy change. A frequent theme was the leading role of Fox News in eroding public trust for American institutions.

==== Iraq war ====
Drum supported the 2003 Iraq War in its early stages. Just before the United States launched its attack, he changed his mind. He said, "Before the war started I switched to opposition on practical grounds (i.e., that George W. Bush's approach was incapable of accomplishing the goals it was meant to accomplish). Since then, I've pretty much come to the conclusion that, in fact, I should have opposed it all along on philosophical grounds: namely that it was a fundamentally flawed concept and had no chance of working even if it had been competently executed."

==== Lead and crime ====
Drum published a series of blogs with evidence that suggests a link between crime and environmental lead, including the link between the decline in American crime rates and the phaseout of leaded gasoline. The theory was popularized by public health researcher Jessica Reyes, as well as economist Rick Nevin. Drum's thesis was criticized by Jim Manzi in January 2013; Drum continued to document new evidence in support of the theory.

==== Homelessness ====
In a 2017 blog post for Mother Jones discussing then-recently published research on public perceptions of the homeless, Drum stated: "The researchers solved their conundrum by suggesting that most people are disgusted by the homeless. No kidding. About half the homeless suffer from a mental illness and a third abuse either alcohol or drugs. You'd be crazy not to have a reflexive disgust of a population like that." Stephen Piston, one of the authors of the research, objected, stating that Drum's article had "profoundly misinterpreted" their research. Pinson wrote: "We argue that media coverage of homeless people often portrays them as unclean or diseased, which activates disgust among the general public. But [Drum] cites our research as proof that homeless people are inherently disgusting — which perpetuates the very problem in journalism our research was trying to solve."

== Personal life and death ==
In an interview with Norman Geras, Drum said that his intellectual heroes were Franklin D. Roosevelt, Isaac Newton, John Maynard Keynes, Edward R. Murrow and Charles Darwin. He also considered Benjamin Franklin his all-time favorite political hero.

Drum lived in Irvine, California. He married his wife Marian in 1993, and she was a familiar presence in his blog posts.

In 2014, Drum began treatment for multiple myeloma. He gave regular health updates describing his successive cancer treatment regimens, presenting himself as a case study of medical progress, with sardonic commentary about the "Evil Dex". In October 18, 2016, he updated readers that it had been two years since his diagnosis and he was "still alive and kicking." In August 2018, he reported that his multiple myeloma remained well under control.

In February 2025, Drum reported that he had been hospitalized with pneumonia and a colon infection, and that his oncologist "agreed my immune system was shot". He died on March 7, 2025 at age 66.
