= Marco Lopez =

Marco Lopez could refer to:

- Marco Lopez (actor) (born 1935), American actor, known for portraying a character named "Marco Lopez" on the television series Emergency!
- Marco A. López Jr. (born 1978), American government official, former mayor of Nogales, Arizona
- Marco López (footballer) (born 1995), Mexican footballer

== See also ==
- Mark Lopez (disambiguation)
- Marcos López (born 1999), Peruvian footballer
