= Mark Lopez =

Mark Lopez or Marc Lopez could refer to:

- Mark López (taekwondo), American Olympic taekwando practitioner
- Mark López (American executive), digital media executive
- Mark Lopez (Filipino executive) (born 1972), chairman of ABS-CBN Corporation
- mark! Lopez, American community organizer and activist
- Mark Hugo Lopez (born 1967), American economist
- Marc López (born 1982), Spanish tennis player

== See also ==
- Marco Lopez (disambiguation)
