= Applied Predictive Technologies =

American software company

- Industry: Software as a service
- Founded: 1999; 27 years ago
- Founder: Jim Manzi; (Chairman); Anthony Bruce; (CEO); Scott Setrakian; (Managing Director)
- Headquarters: Arlington, Virginia, United States
- Number of employees: 600
- Website: mastercardservices.com/en/solutions/test-learn

Applied Predictive Technologies (APT) is an American software company that produces test and learn software used for business analytics. The company was founded in 1999, and was acquired by Mastercard in 2015.

== History ==
APT was founded in December 1999 by business consulting executives Jim Manzi (Oliver Wyman), Anthony Bruce (McKinsey & Company), and Scott Setrakian (Oliver Wyman). Manzi had the initial idea for APT in 1988 when he thought of a test he could apply to a bank and its branches. He explained to The Washington Post that "a lot of the work I was doing as a consultant was very repetitive. I realized how much of it could be put into a software model.” In September 2001, the company signed its first client. It expanded, and in 2006, Accel-KKR acquired a majority stake in APT with a $54 million investment, and in 2013, Goldman Sachs invested $100 million. Mastercard acquired APT for $600 million in 2015.

== Software ==
APT (now Mastercard) produces test and learn software for business analytics.

In February 2011, APT was awarded a patent that protects its core analytic technology for designing an in-market test and on matching test stores to control stores. One of the company's patents was invalidated in 2020 by the US district court.

Commercial applications of APT's Test & Learn software have included food companies evaluating effects of new items on sales of existing products, as well as whether a promotional discount would be offset by increased sales of other products. The software has also been used non-commercially to analyze the effectiveness of a 911 diversion program for mental health related calls the city of St. Louis, Missouri launched in 2021.

== Litigation ==
APT filed a lawsuit against the company MarketDial in June 2018 alleging that MarketDial's co-founders stole trade secrets that they had access to while working as consultants, and that the company infringed on a patent held by APT. The patent infringement claim was dismissed by a judge in November 2020, along with claims of civil conspiracy and fraud.

In April 2024, the presiding judge granted MarketDial's request for summary judgment. According to Bloomberg Law:

"[Judge] Parrish concluded APT fell well short of explaining what particular elements of its documents were not widely ascertainable or establishing how each had independent economic value as a secret.

“'Summary judgment was Plaintiff’s chance to put its cards on the table and make an argument, rather than simply string-cite exhibits and insist that from the mosaic of exhibits a trade secret might emerge at trial,' Parrish wrote. 'Simply stated, this court will not do APT’s job for it by mining its trade secrets from the raw materials, dusting off known information and techniques, and preparing its case for submission to the jury.'

"She also expressed 'grave doubt' that APT had shown the information claimed as a trade secret was improperly acquired or used."

In March 2025, the presiding judge "...ordered [APT / Mastercard] to cough up over $2.8 million in legal fees for 'aggressively' litigating an 'objectively specious' trade secrets suit..."

APT appealed this decision and in January 2026 lost its effort to overturn.

== See also ==
- Test and learn
