= Richard Fairbank =

American businessman (born 1950)

- Born: Richard Dana Fairbank; September 18, 1950 (age 75)
- Education: Stanford University (BS, MBA)
- Occupation: Businessman
- Known for: co-founding Capital One with Nigel Morris
- Title: Chairman and CEO, Capital One
- Spouse: Chris Fairbank
- Children: 8

Richard Dana Fairbank (born September 18, 1950) is an American billionaire businessman who co-founded Capital One with Nigel Morris in 1988. He was on the board of directors of MasterCard International from 2004 to 2006. He is a member of the Stanford Business School advisory council, the Financial Services Roundtable, and the board of directors of the BITS Technology Forum.

Fairbank has been awarded "Business Leader of the Year" by Washingtonian, and placed on lists including Worth's list of the top 10 CEOs and "50 Best CEOs."

== Education ==
Fairbank enrolled at Pomona College before transferring to Stanford University, where he earned a bachelor's degree in economics in 1972. He later earned an MBA from the Stanford Graduate School of Business in 1981, where he graduated first in his class. He also received the Excellence in Leadership award from Stanford University in 2006.

== Career ==
After graduating, he spent seven years as a consultant with Strategic Planning Associates, which later became Mercer Management Consulting, now part of the Oliver Wyman group. Fairbank eventually ran SPA's financial services practice. In 1988, Fairbank and Nigel Morris set up a new, data-driven, credit card division for a small Virginia bank called Signet Bank. Signet spun off the division in 1994, and Fairbank became its CEO.

== Compensation ==
While CEO of Capital One Financial in 2009, Fairbank earned a total compensation of $6,076,805, which included no base salary, no cash bonus, $2,000,019 in stock awards, $4,000,001 in option awards, and $76,785 in other compensation. In 2012, Fairbank's total compensation was $22.6 million. Fairbank has received a base salary of zero dollars since 1997.

In January 2018, with Capital One's share price reaching a record high, Fairbank's net worth rose to about $1.1 billion.

In 2024, Fairbank earned $33.5 million and a $30 million bonus to close a deal to buy Discover Financial.

== Personal life ==
Fairbank's father was physicist William M. Fairbank. Richard Fairbank is married to Chris, and they have eight children.

They own and live at Overlook Farm, near Gunston Hall on the Potomac River in Virginia.
