= Nigel Morris =

British businessman (born 1958)

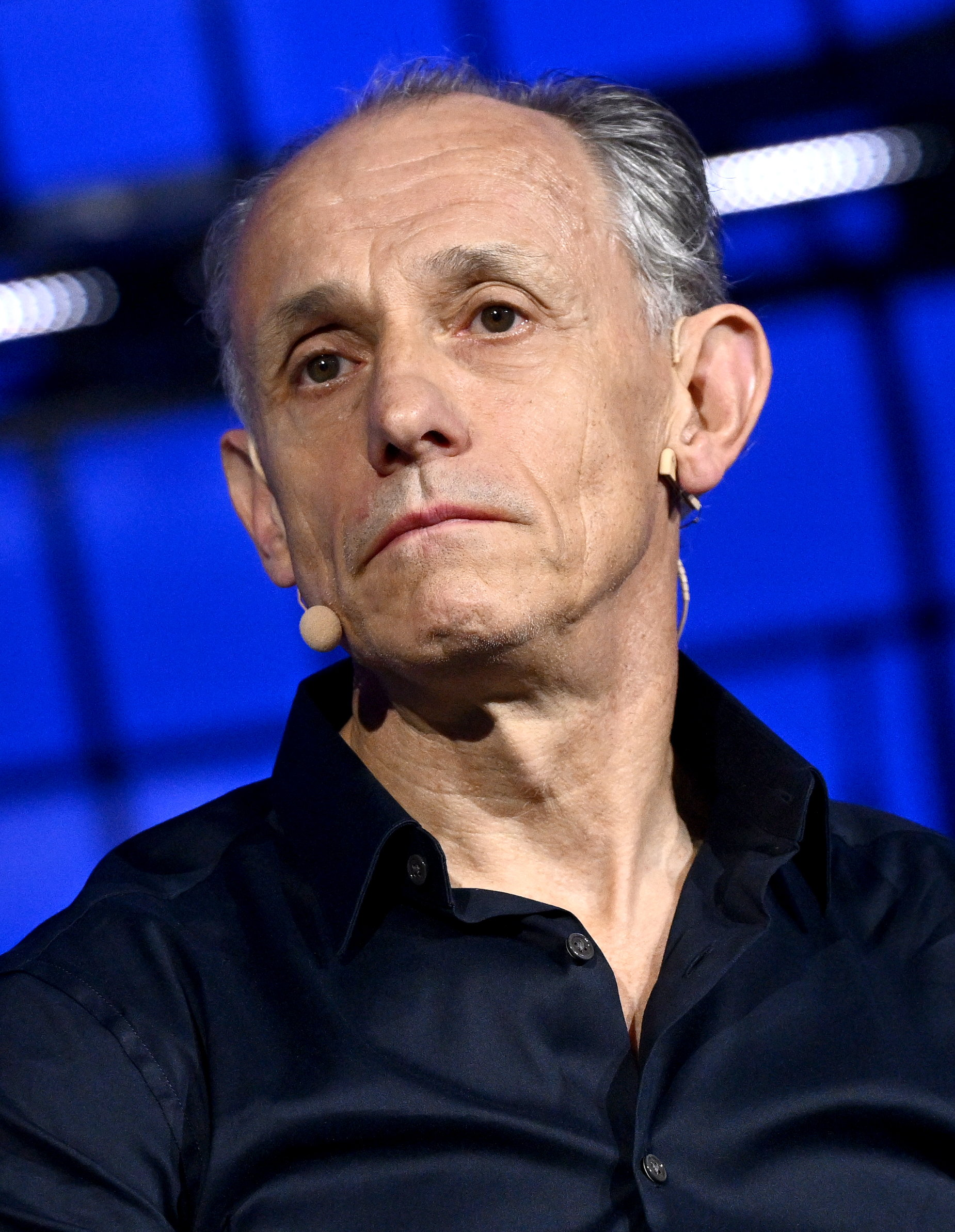
- Morris in 2023
- Born: June 1958 (age 68); Billericay, Essex, England
- Education: Lancaster Royal Grammar School
- Alma mater: North East London Polytechnic; London Business School
- Occupation: Businessman
- Known for: co-founded Capital One with Richard Fairbank
- Title: Managing partner, QED Investors
- Board member of: Swansea City Football Club; London Business School; National Geographic; Remitly
- Children: 4

Nigel William Morris (born June 1958) is a British businessman. He is the managing partner of QED Investors and co-founded Capital One Financial Services with Richard Fairbank. He is also part of the ownership group of Welsh football club Swansea City.

== Early life ==
Nigel William Morris was born in Billericay, Essex, the son of an army sergeant, in June 1958. He came from a working-class Welsh family: his mother was a fluent Welsh speaker from Blaenau Ffestiniog and his father was born in Essex to a family from Port Talbot. Morris grew up in Essex.

With an army father, and moving around the country, Morris went to 11 different schools, ending up at Lancaster Royal Grammar School. Morris earned a bachelor's degree in psychology from North East London Polytechnic, followed by an MBA from London Business School, where he is also a Fellow.

== Career ==
Morris moved to Philadelphia in the 1980s where he met his future co-founder Rich Fairbank. They worked for Strategic Planning Associates (now known as Mercer Consulting) where they formed the company's banking function, focussed on the credit card industry. He moved to Signet Bank to focus on credit, but faced resistance to attempts to expand into the Canadian market, spurring him to start his own business.

Established in 1994 spun out of Signet Financial Corp, Morris co-founded and was Chief Operating Officer of Capital One Financial Services. During Morris's ten-year tenure as president, Capital One's net income after taxes (NIAT) grew at a compound annual rate of more than 32%. He left the bank in 2004, shifting to venture capital investing.

In 2007 Morris founded QED Investors with CIO Frank Rotman. QED is a venture capital firm focused on high-growth financial technology companies. In addition, he works in an advisory capacity with personalized prepaid debit card provider CARD.com, General Atlantic Partners and Oliver Wyman Consulting. He is on the board of for-profit companies, including Mission Lane, Remitly, Red Ventures, CAN Capital, Media Math, borro, and Prosper. He is also on the boards of National Geographic, ideas42, and the London Business School.

In 2023, Morris joined Swansea City's ownership group, joining the board and investing a reported £10m in return for a shareholding in the club of 19.42 per cent.

== Personal life ==
Morris lives in Virginia, United States with his wife and four children. He is a Tottenham Hotspur fan. He purchased St Michael's Church in Llan Ffestiniog, the village where his mother grew up, married, and where his parents are buried.
