= Miqdaad Versi =

British media monitoring director at the Muslim Council of Britain

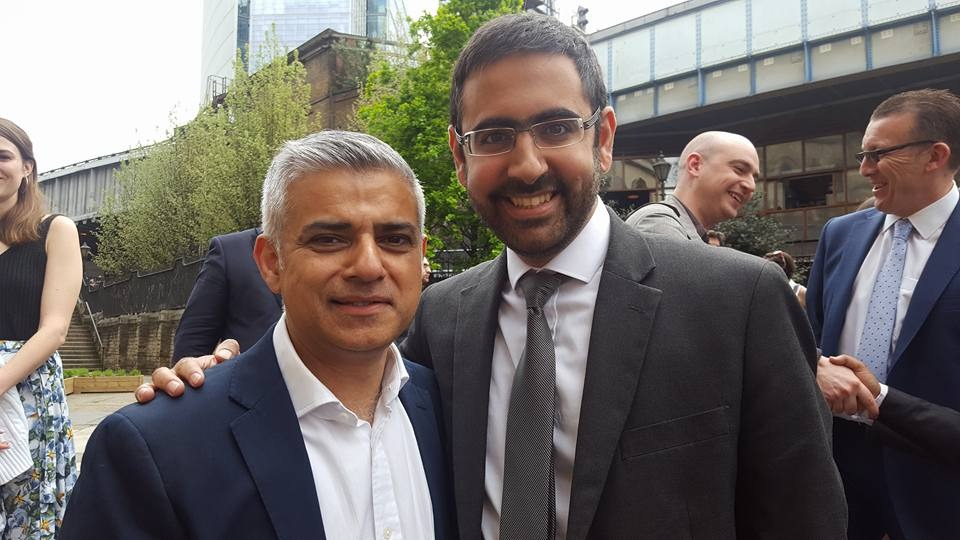
Photo of Miqdaad Versi with Mayor Sadiq Khan in 2016

Miqdaad Versi is the founder and lead strategist of the Centre for Media Monitoring. He used to be one of the Muslim Council of Britain's most active public representatives. Versi is also a prolific writer, voicing concerns over the misrepresentation of Muslims in the Guardian, Independent and other news outlets. The Guardian described him as "the UK’s one-man Islamophobia media monitor."

Versi occasionally writes opinion pieces for the Guardian and the Independent. He is a board member of Rights Watch UK. Versi also runs a travel agency in north-west London full-time.

Versi grew up in Harrow, London in an Indian family. His father moved to the UK from east Africa in the 1970s and worked as an engineer. His mother worked as a nursery teacher. He read mathematics at the University of Oxford.

During his university studies, in pursuit of his interest in Islamic jurisprudence, Versi spent one year in Damascus, Syria learning Arabic and Islamic law. He later worked for Oliver Wyman and then for the Royal Bank of Scotland.

== Litigation ==
Versi sued for defamation following Ed Husain accusing Versi of being, "pro-Hamas pro-Iran pro-gender discrimination pro-blasphemy laws pro-secretarian (sic) [and] anti-Western." Versi won two preliminary trials in which the High Court found that the ordinary meaning of the words was defamatory; and that it was inappropriate to argue a partial defence in a separate pre-trial hearing, ordering Husain to pay costs.
