= Capital One Shopping =

Digital platforms for online comparison shopping and rewards

Capital One Shopping is a browser plugin, website and mobile app that offers e-commerce comparison shopping and cash back at online retailers (more than 30,000) that participate in its programs. It is operated by Wikibuy, LLC of Plano, Texas, and is primarily aimed at consumers in the United States.

== Services ==
Services include product search, automated coupon codes, shopping credits, and watchlist.

Capital One Shopping searches the internet for products and automated coupon codes for relevant products. It also compares prices among various merchants. When shoppers purchase from participating retailers using the Capital One Shopping browser extension or app, they earn rewards in the form of shopping credits, which can then be used to buy gift cards.

The watchlist function lets users know when prices drop on products that they have viewed and/or purchased.

== Technical specifications ==
Capital One Shopping's browser extension is compatible with Google Chrome, Mozilla Firefox, Microsoft Edge and Safari. The mobile version is available for both iOS and Android devices and is designed primarily for use within the U.S.

== Reception ==
Consumer financial site NerdWallet recommends Capital Online Shopping, among several other competitors, but warns that such sites collect basic information about users, such as name, mailing address, and email address, which is often used for marketing purposes.

CNET rated the service "Best for Gift Cards".
