= Rick Nevin =

American economist

Rick Nevin is an economic consultant who acts as an adviser to the National Center for Healthy Housing and has worked on the Federal Strategy to eliminate childhood lead poisoning. Amongst other research, he has published papers in the journal Environmental Research claiming to demonstrate a link between environmental lead exposure and violent crime in the United States and in nine countries worldwide. This research has been publicized in the press by a Washington Post article in July 2007, by Mother Jones in 2013, and elsewhere, including the UK's Independent in October 2007 and Guardian in 2013. Nevin's work on lead pollution has also featured in numerous books about public health, social sciences and social justice, criminology, environmentalism and sustainability, and air pollution.

== See also ==
- Lead–crime hypothesis
