= Paribus =

American software company

- Type: Subsidiary
- Industry: Technology; Software
- Founded: 2014
- Founder: Eric Glyman (CEO); Karim Atiyeh (CTO)
- Headquarters: Brooklyn, NY
- Area served: Worldwide
- Parent: Capital One
- Website: www.paribus.co

Paribus was a price-tracking service founded in 2014 that monitored online purchase receipts to identify opportunities for price-adjustment claims.

== History ==
Paribus was founded in 2014 by Eric Glyman and Karim Atiyeh. The company is based in Brooklyn, New York. The name is derived from the Latin phrase ceteris paribus, meaning "all other things being equal."

The founders developed the concept in 2013 to simplify the process of receiving a refund following a price drop. and launched a beta version of the service in September 2014, with a public introduction at TechCrunch Disrupt New York on 5 May 2015. Paribus released its iOS app on August 6, 2015, and its Android app on April 28, 2016.

In October 2015 Paribus announced a seed funding round of about $2.1 million following participation in Y Combinator and TechCrunch Startup Battlefield. The round was reported to have been led by General Catalyst Partners and also included Greylock Partners, Foundation Capital, Soma Capital and Mick Johnson.

In October 2016, it was announced that Paribus had been acquired by Capital One. Following the acquisition, the service was integrated into Capital One’s suite of shopping and price-protection features; specific product changes and service availability have varied over time. As of January 2023, Capital One discontinued the Capital One Price Protection feature of Capital One Shopping.

== Software ==
Paribus connected to a user's email account to scan messages for receipts from e-commerce retailers. When a qualifying price adjustment opportunity was detected, the service submitted claims on the user’s behalf to request refunds or adjustments according to the retailer’s policies. It was also able to detect coupons or promo codes that could have been applied to a purchase, and have the coupon redeemed retroactively. The app is free. After the acquisition closed with Capital One, Paribus users began to keep 100% of the savings. It was available on the iPhone, iPad, iPod Touch, and on Android smartphones and tablets.

At its launch, the service worked with 18 major retailers, including Amazon.com, Best Buy, Walmart, Target, Macy's and Newegg. This list had grown to 29 retailers in the United States by December 2017. The company states that the average user saves between $60 and $100 per year. As of October 2016, it had over 700,000 users.

== See also ==
- Tech companies in the New York metropolitan area
