= Marco López (footballer) =

Mexican football player (born 1995)

Personal information
- Full name: Marco Antonio López Escobar
- Date of birth: 20 March 1995 (age 31)
- Place of birth: Guanajuato, Guanajuato, México
- Height: 1.71 m (5 ft 7 1/2 in)
- Position: Left-back

Team information
- Current team: Universidad de Guadalajara

Youth career
- 2009–2016: C.D. Guadalajara

Senior career*
Years	Team	Apps	(Gls)
2016–	C.D. Guadalajara	0	(0)
2017–2018	→ Irapuato F.C. (loan)	33	(0)
2018–	→ Universidad de Guadalajara (loan)	10	(0)
- * Club domestic league appearances and goals as of August 22, 2019

Marco Antonio López Escobar (born 20 March 1995) is a Mexican footballer who plays as a left-back for Universidad de Guadalajara on loan from C.D. Guadalajara.
