= Mark López (American executive) =

American businessman

Mark Ignacio López
- Born: United States
- Education: Massachusetts Institute of Technology (MIT)
- Occupation: Media executive
- Known for: EVP - General Manager of Univision Interactive Media at Univision Communications

Mark López is an American digital media business executive who was the former EVP and General Manager of Univision Interactive Media at Univision Communications and Head of U.S. Hispanic Audience at Google.

== Education ==
López holds a bachelor's degree from Rensselaer Polytechnic Institute in New York and an MBA from the MIT Sloan School of Management.

== Career ==
López began his career as a senior consultant at Mercer Management Consulting and Andersen Consulting, and then became the Director of Strategic Alliances at J2 Communications. After working at J2 Communications, López was part of the team that started Terra Networks in the U.S., and was named Chief Operating Officer of Terra Networks USA in 2007. He then worked for AOL as Publisher of their U.S. Hispanic audience.

In November 2010, he was hired as head of U.S. Hispanic Audience at Google, a new position at the company.

In May 2015, Lopez joined Univision Communications to lead the digital business reporting to Isaac Lee President of Univision Digital. He left Univision Communications in December 2016.

He has served on the board of the IAB and its Multicultural Council and is Board Advisor to the Center of Hispanic Marketing Communications at Florida State University.
