= Jim Manzi (software entrepreneur) =

American technology entrepreneur (born 1963)

- Born: 1963 (age 62–63)
- Education: Wharton School of the University of Pennsylvania, Massachusetts Institute of Technology
- Occupations: Chairman of Applied Predictive Technologies
- Political party: Independent

James J. Manzi (/ˈmænzi/; born 1963) is an American technology entrepreneur. He was the founder and chairman of Applied Predictive Technologies (a business analytics firm) that was sold to MasterCard in 2015 for $600 million. He subsequently co-founded the artificial intelligence software company Foundry.ai. He is the inventor of a series of related software patents.

Manzi has also written widely on the philosophy of science, politics and policy. He is the author of the book Uncontrolled, which argues for the more widespread use of randomized experimentation in business and social science. He co-authored an article on the use of randomized experimentation in business for the Harvard Business Review. He is a contributing editor at National Review, a senior fellow at the Manhattan Institute, and was formerly a contributor to a variety of blogs.

== Early life and education ==
Manzi grew up in Spring Lake, New Jersey, a community that he described as "pretty much Mayberry-by-the-Sea". He graduated from the Massachusetts Institute of Technology in 1984 with a B.S. in mathematics. He was also awarded a Dean's Fellowship in statistics to the Wharton School of the University of Pennsylvania as one of the eight top matriculants to the business school's doctoral programs.

== Career ==
After college, Manzi joined AT&T Laboratories and developed early PC-based pattern recognition software in their Data Networks division. He subsequently worked as a corporate strategy consultant at Boston Consulting Group spin-off Strategic Planning Associates. In 1999, he left and founded Applied Predictive Technologies in his apartment. Manzi served as CEO until 2008, at which point he was named Executive Chairman. He is also a senior fellow at the Manhattan Institute and a contributing editor of National Review.

=== Political views and commentary ===
Manzi has written articles for a variety of political publications including the New York Post, The Weekly Standard, The Atlantic, and Slate. Manzi cites Sir Francis Bacon's New Method as a significant inspiration for and influence on his book Uncontrolled: the Surprising Power of Trial and Error for Business, Politics, and Society, saying of it, "there are an incredible array of insights in that book but one of the most fundamental is his argument that we have a tendency to jump to conclusions, that we see patterns in nature and believe we’ve found what we would call today causal rules, but we’re kidding ourselves." Bacon's idea underpins Manzi's thesis that trial and error plays a significant role in helping companies and societies adapt and progress. He has also contributed to the blogs of those publications and others, such as The American Scene, Andrew Sullivan's The Daily Dish, and National Review's The Corner. David Brooks identified him as one of the "reformers" within the Republican Party, and later noted Manzi's National Affairs article Keeping America's Edge as one of the best magazine essays of 2009.

==== Specific positions ====
Manzi has written about climate change, prominently in a controversial National Review cover article in which he argued that conservatives should stop denying global warming is happening, which Rush Limbaugh attacked. He said that while climate change may be a real phenomenon, the current evidence does not justify the economic costs required to reduce carbon emissions. In writing about the future of the Republican Party, he argued that the primary challenge for conservatives is to "continue to increase the market orientation of the American economy while helping more Americans to participate in it more equally".

== See also ==
- Climate change policy of the United States
- List of climate change controversies
- Media coverage of climate change
