= Capital One =

American bank holding company

Capital One Financial Corporation

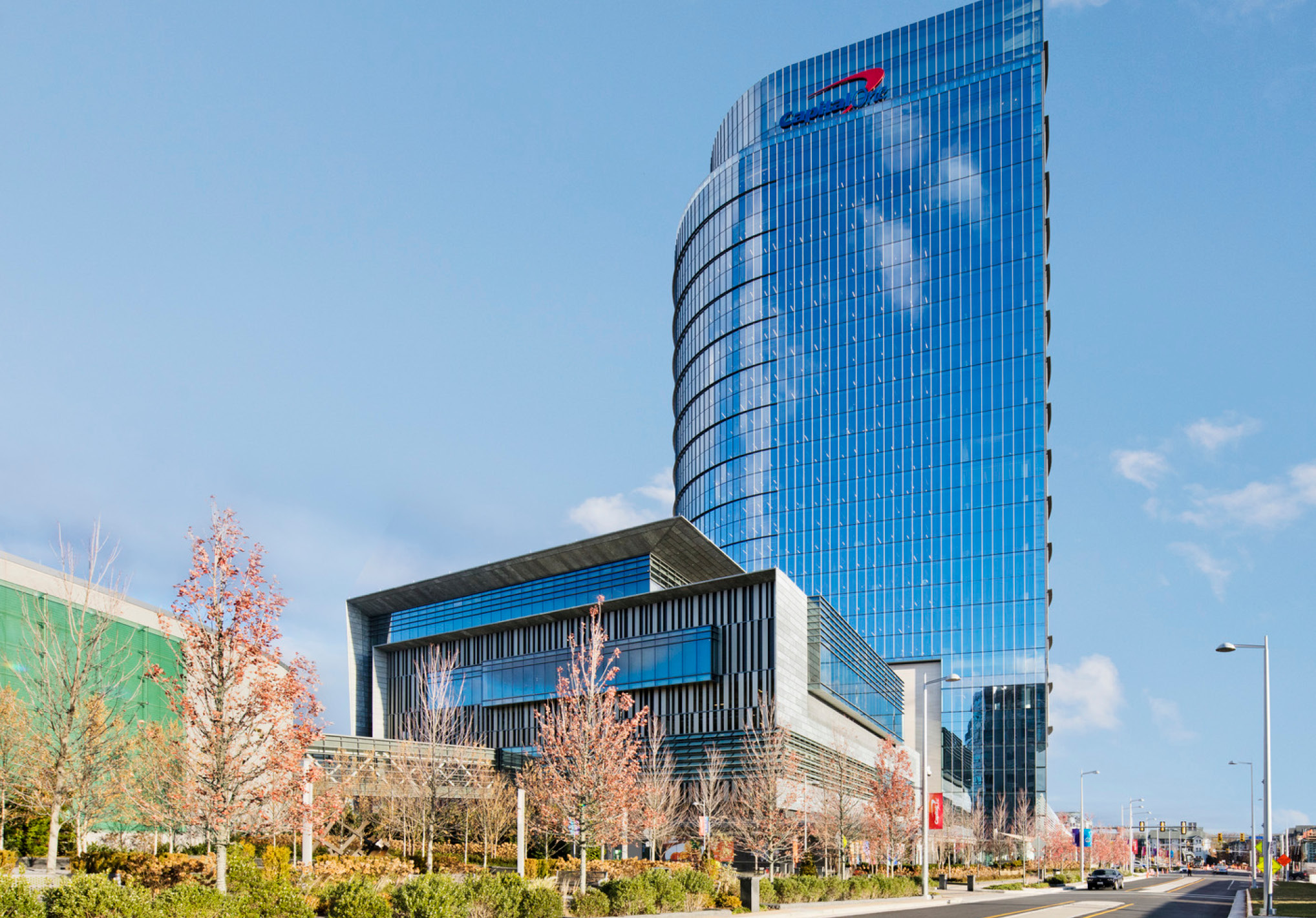
- Capital One Tower, the company's headquarters in Tysons, Virginia
- Type: Public company
- Traded as: NYSE: COF; S&P 100 component; S&P 500 component
- Industry: Financial services
- Founded: July 21, 1994; 32 years ago in Richmond, Virginia, U.S.
- Founders: Richard Fairbank; Nigel Morris
- Headquarters: Capital One Tower, Tysons, Virginia, U.S.
- Areas served: Canada, United Kingdom, United States
- Key people: Richard Fairbank (chairman, president and CEO); Andrew Young (CFO); Sanjiv Yajnik (President of Financial Services)
- Brands: Capital One; CreditWise; Discover; Diners Club; Pulse
- Revenue: ▲US$53.4 billion (2025)
- Operating income: ▲US$5.91 billion (2024)
- Net income: ▲US$4.747 billion (income before tax) (2024)
- Total assets: ▲US$669.009 billion (2025)
- Total equity: ▲US$94.552 billion (2025)
- Number of employees: 76,300 (2025)
- Capital ratio: 12.9% (2023)
- Website: capitalone.com
- Footnotes; Financials as of December 31, 2022

Capital One Financial Corporation is an American bank holding company headquartered in Tysons, Virginia, with operations in the United States, Canada, and the United Kingdom. It is one of the largest banks in the United States, one of the largest car finance companies in the United States, and is the largest issuer of credit cards in the United States. It owns the Discover Card, Diners Club, and Pulse payment networks. The company's three business segments are credit cards, consumer banking, and commercial banking. It has approximately 750 bank branches, including over 60 café style locations, and 7,000 ATMs in the United States. The company's corporate headquarters are in the Capital One Tower and its European headquarters are in Trent House, Nottingham.

The company is ranked 82nd on the Fortune 500. The company helped pioneer the mass marketing of credit cards in the 1990s.

== History ==
=== 1994–2004 ===
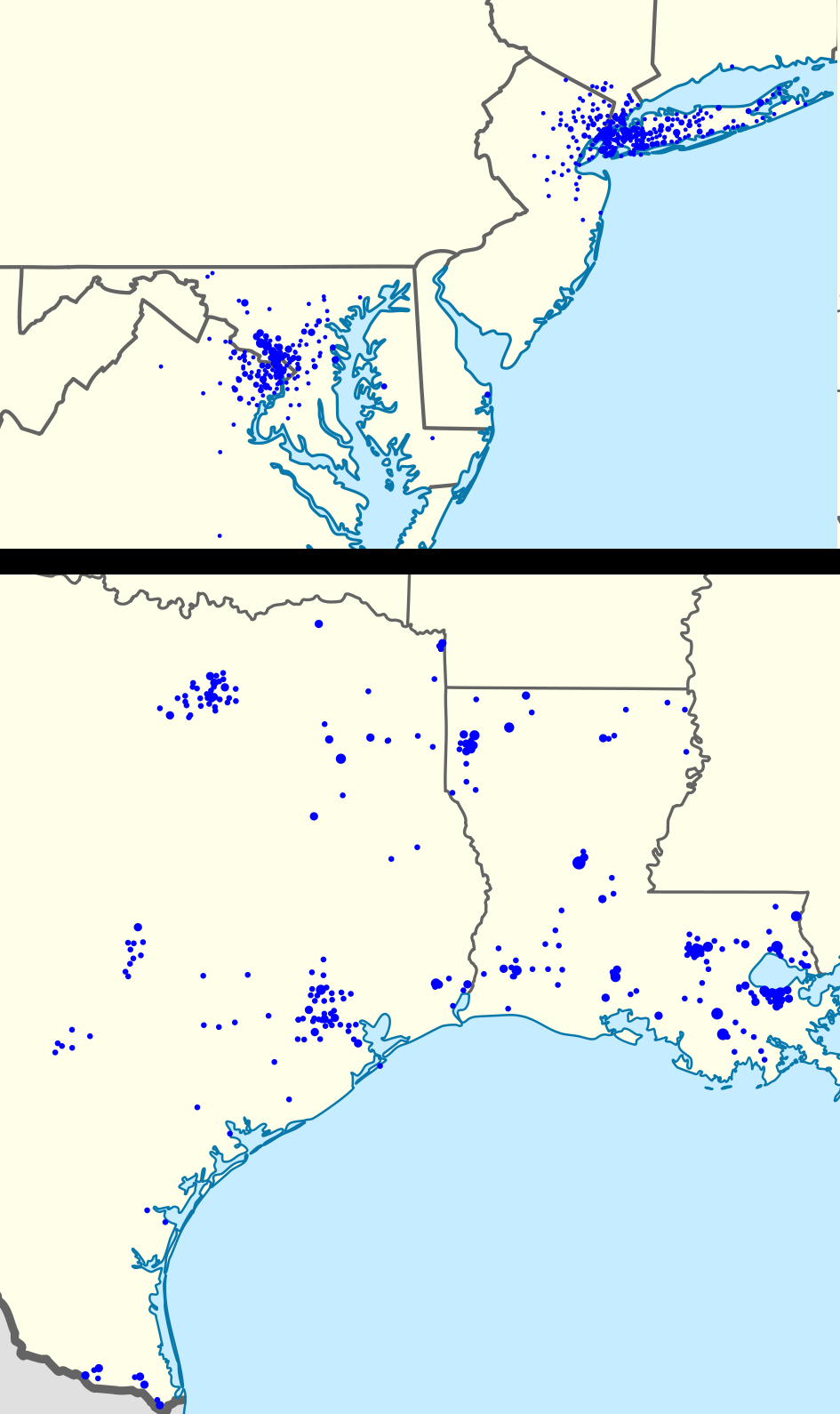
Capital One retail footprint as of 2010

Richard Fairbank and Nigel Morris developed the idea of using information technology and statistical analysis to create customized credit card offers for different segments of customers in 1987. At the time, most credit cards would offer the same terms—interest rate and annual fee—to almost everyone, regardless of the financial risks of each customer. However, Fairbank and Morris' idea was to drop the fee and target various credit card terms to specific customers. They consulted with Oracle Corporation on how to compile the demographics and other statistics that would help them sort out and identify those customer market segments.

They then started soliciting banks regarding using their approach, indicating that they anticipated large profits based on the large numbers of customers they projected to enroll. They convinced Richmond, Virginia-based Signet Bank to start a credit card division called Signet Financial in 1988 that would use their approach. As part of the deal, they became employees of Signet. In 1991, Fairbank and Morris were successful with a mass mailing that offered to transfer existing credit card balances from other banks' credit cards for the opportunity of a lower interest rate with Signet.

In July 1994, Signet Financial announced the corporate spin-off of Capital One, at first naming it OakStone Financial with Fairbank as CEO and Morris as COO. After the initial public offering in October 1994, the new company was renamed Capital One. The spin-off was completed in February 1995.

At that time, Capital One was a monoline bank, meaning that all of its revenue came from a single product, in this case, credit cards. This strategy is risky in that it can lead to losses during bad times. Capital One attributed its relative success as a monoline to its use of data collection to build demographic profiles, allowing it to target personalized offers of credit directly to consumers.

=== 1996–2005 ===
In 1996, Capital One moved from relying on teaser rates to generate new clients to adopting more innovative techniques that would attract more customers to their business model. At the time, it was losing customers to competitors who offered higher ceilings on loan balances and no-annual-fee accounts. The company came up with co-branded, secured, and joint account credit cards. In mid-1996, Capital One received approval from the federal government to set up Capital One FSB. This meant that the company could now retain and lend out deposits on secured cards and even issue automobile installment loans.

In 1996, Capital One expanded to the United Kingdom and Canada.

In July 1998, Capital One acquired auto financing company Summit Acceptance Corporation.

In 1999, CEO Richard Fairbank announced moves to use Capital One's experience with collecting consumer data to offer loans, insurance, and phone service.

In October 2001, PeopleFirst Finance was acquired by Capital One. The companies were combined and re-branded as Capital One Auto Finance Corporation in 2003.

In late 2002, Capital One and the United States Postal Service proposed a negotiated services agreement (NSA) for bulk discounts in mailing services. The resulting three-year agreement was extended in 2006. In June 2008, however, Capital One filed a complaint with the USPS regarding the terms of the next agreement, citing the terms of the NSA of Capital One's competitor, Bank of America. Capital One subsequently withdrew its complaint to the Postal Regulatory Commission following a settlement with the USPS.

Automobile loan financer Onyx Acceptance Corporation was acquired by Capital One in January 2005.

=== 2005–present ===
Capital One Café in Chicago

In 2005, Capital One acquired New Orleans, Louisiana-based Hibernia National Bank for $4.9 billion in cash and stock, becoming the first monoline credit card issuer to buy a bank. This reduced its dependency on the credit-card business.

Capital One acquired Melville, New York-based North Fork Bank and its subsidiary, GreenPoint Mortgage, for $13.2 billion in cash and stock in 2006. In August 2007, during the subprime mortgage crisis, Capital One closed GreenPoint Mortgage, due in part to investor pressures, cutting 1,900 jobs and leading to $860 million in charges.

In August 2007, Capital One agreed to acquire NetSpend for $700 million. In November 2007, the transaction was modified; Capital One instead acquired just a minority interest in NetSpend.

In 2008, Capital One received an investment of $3.56 billion from the United States Treasury as a result of the Troubled Asset Relief Program. In June 2009, Capital One repurchased the stock the company issued to the U.S. Treasury for $3.67 billion, resulting in a profit of over $100 million to the U.S. Treasury.

In 2008, Capital One debuted its blue and red "swoosh" logo, and began a $13 billion marketing campaign. The similarity of the logo to that of Credit One Bank, which adopted a similar logo in 2006, caused confusion among consumers, with many not realizing they were separate companies. In February 2009, Capital One acquired Chevy Chase Bank for $520 million in cash and stock. In January 2011, Capital One acquired Canada-based Hudson's Bay Company's private credit card portfolio from GE Financial.

In April 2011, Capital One signed a deal with Kohl's to handle Kohl's private label credit card program that was previously serviced by Chase Bank for a seven-year period for an undisclosed amount. The contract was extended several times.

In June 2011, ING Group announced the sale of its ING Direct division to Capital One for $9 billion in cash and stock. The transaction was scrutinized by Barney Frank, Thomas M. Hoenig, and others on the basis of the bank becoming too big to fail, but nevertheless, the acquisition received regulatory approval and was completed in February 2012. ING Direct was rebranded as Capital One 360 in March 2013, a move announced to customers in November 2012.

In August 2011, Capital One acquired the U.S. credit card operations of HSBC. Capital One paid $31.3 billion in exchange for $28.2 billion in loans and $600 million in other assets. The acquisition was completed in May 2012. The acquisition also included private issued credit cards for such companies as Saks Fifth Avenue, Neiman Marcus, and Lord & Taylor that were previously handled by HSBC.

In February 2012, along with several other banks, Capital One announced support for the Isis Mobile Wallet payment system. However, in September 2013, Capital One dropped support for the venture.

In 2012, Capital One closed 41 branch locations.

In February 2014, Capital One amended its terms of use to allow it to "contact you in any manner we choose", including a "personal visit . . . at your home and at your place of employment". It also asserted its right to "modify or suppress caller ID and similar services and identify ourselves on these services in any manner we choose". The company stated that it would not actually make personal visits to customers except "As a last resort, . . . if it becomes necessary to repossess [a] sports vehicle". Capital One also attributed its assertion of a right to "spoof" as necessary because "sometimes the number is 'displayed differently' by 'some local phone exchanges,' something that is 'beyond our control'".

In February 2014, Capital One acquired 25% of ClearXchange, a peer-to-peer transaction money transfer service. ClearXchange was sold to Early Warning in 2016. In October 2014, Capital One acquired Adaptive Path, a San Francisco-based user experience and digital design consultancy. In January 2015, Capital One acquired Level Money, a budgeting app for consumers. In July 2015, the company acquired Monsoon, a design studio, development shop, marketing house and strategic consultancy. In 2015, Capital One acquired General Electric's Healthcare Financial Services unit, which included $8.5 billion in loans made to businesses in the healthcare industry, for $9 billion.

In October 2016, Capital One acquired Paribus, a price tracking service, for an undisclosed amount. The company exited the mortgage origination business in November 2017 due to competition, laying off 1,100 employees.

In January 2018, Capital One sold its online brokerage with more than 1 million brokerage accounts to E-Trade for $170 million. In May 2018, the company acquired Confyrm, a digital identity and fraud alert service. In July 2018, Capital One sold its full-service investment advisory and brokerage division to Woodbury Financial. In November 2018, Capital One acquired Wikibuy, a shopping comparison app and browser extension from an Austin, Texas start-up business and renamed it Capital One Shopping. In June 2019, Capital One acquired BlueTarp Financial, a business-to-business credit services provider. In July 2019, Capital One signed a deal with Walmart to handle Walmart's private label and co-branded credit card programs that was previously serviced by Synchrony Financial. Walmart terminated the deal in April 2024 after customer service failures by Capital One. In August 2019, Capital One acquired KippsDeSanto, an investment bank focused on government contractors.

In October 2021, Capital One acquired the healthcare investment bank of TripleTree Holdings.

In November 2021, the company introduced Venture X, an incentive program credit card, with a $395 annual fee.

In March 2022, Capital One announced a partnership with Vivid Seats to launch Capital One Entertainment, a rewards programs for cardholders.

Acquisition of Discover Financial by Capital One

- Initiator: Capital One
- Target: Discover Financial
- Type: Full acquisition
- Cost: US$35 billion
- Initiated: February 19, 2024
- Completed: May 18, 2025

In February 2024, Capital One agreed to acquire Discover Financial in an all-stock deal worth $35.3 billion, making it the largest credit card issuer in the U.S. The deal was approved by U.S. banking regulators in April 2025 after an investigation by the Attorney General of New York and a proposed consumer class action lawsuit by customers on anti-trust concerns. The acquisition was completed in May 2025.

In November 2025, Capital One acquired Hopper Travel Software, which powered Capital One Travel. In March 2026, Capital One announced it would lay off over 1,100 employees from the former Discover headquarters. In April 2026, the company acquired Brex for $5.15 billion. Brex had around 1,100 employees.

== Television advertisements ==
Between 2010 and 2013, Alec Baldwin was the spokesperson for Capital One's television ad campaigns. Following his 2013 confrontation with a videographer reported by TMZ, his contract was not renewed, and he was succeeded in the campaign by Jennifer Garner.

In 2012, Capital One released an advert featuring British power metal band DragonForce. The advert showed Herman Li and Sam Totman playing guitar on an asteroid while using Capital One's mobile app.

== Sports sponsorships ==
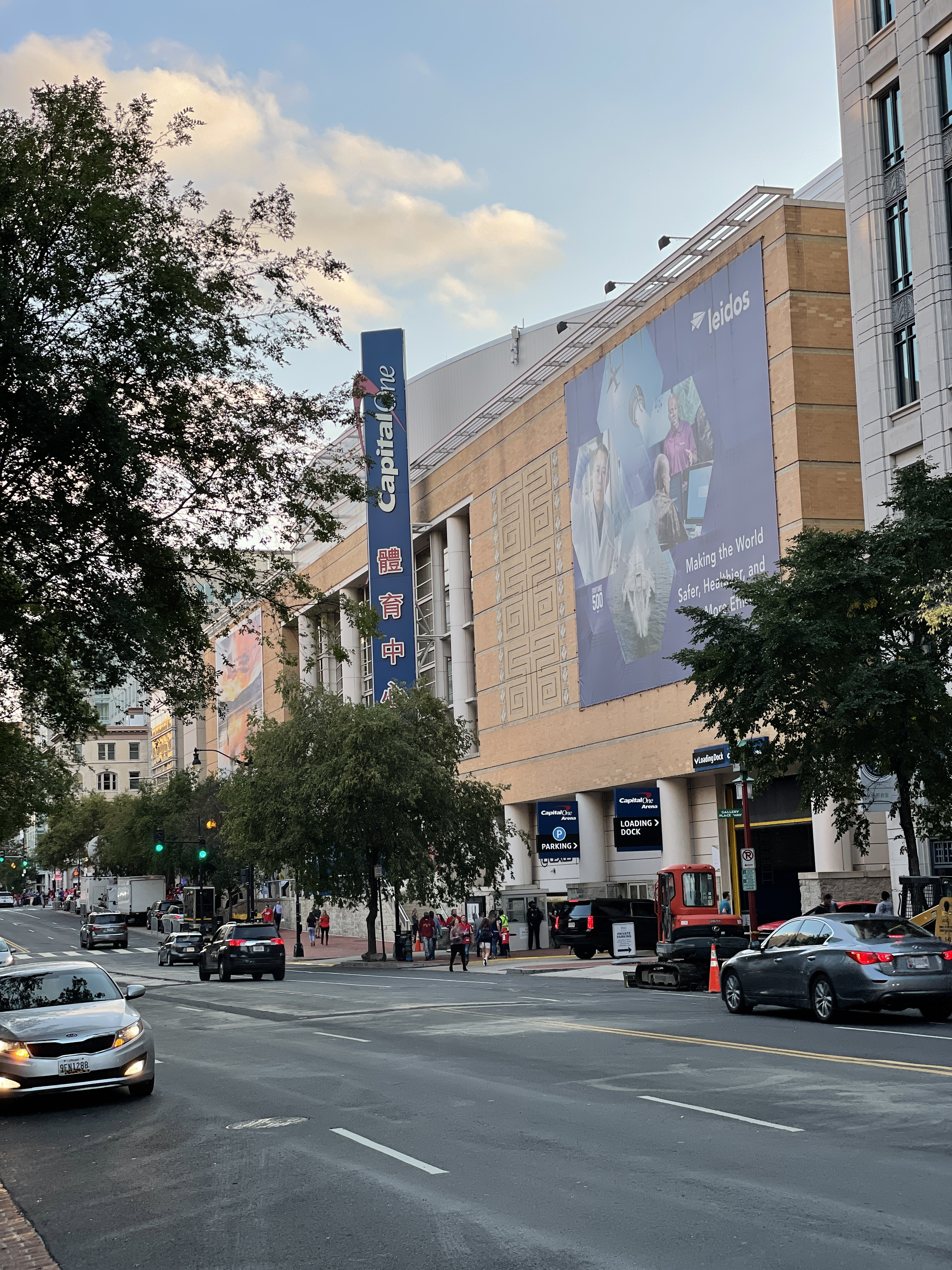
Capital One owns the naming rights for the major sports and entertainment arena in Washington, D.C.

From 2001 to 2014, Capital One was the principal sponsor of the college football Florida Citrus Bowl, which was called the Capital One Bowl from 2003 to 2014. It sponsored a mascot challenge every year, announcing the winner on the day of the Capital One Bowl. The name of the bowl game was changed in 2015 to the Buffalo Wild Wings Citrus Bowl. Capital One is the title sponsor of the Orange Bowl since 2015. Capital One Venture X is the presenting sponsor of the Rose Bowl Game since 2022.

Capital One has been a major sponsor of the NCAA since 2010. As of 2013, it paid an estimated $35 million annually in exchange for advertising and access to consumer data. Capital One also sponsored the EFL Cup, an English soccer knockout tournament, from 2012 to 2016. The company sponsored English soccer clubs Nottingham Forest from 2003 to 2009 and Sheffield United from 2006 to 2008. From 2009 to 2022, the company owned the naming rights to the field at SECU Stadium (formerly Byrd Stadium), inherited in the bank's acquisition of Chevy Chase Bank.

In August 2017, the company agreed to pay $100 million for a 10-year deal for the naming rights of the Capital One Arena in Washington, D.C. In August 2026, Capital One agreed to a 20-year extension of its naming rights deal.

To celebrate the Washington Capitals' appearance in the 2018 Stanley Cup Final, the firm temporarily changed its logo by replacing the word "Capital" with the Capitals' titular logo, without the "s" plural.

In March 2022, Capital One agreed to pay $125 million over 5 years to become the "official bank and credit card partner" of Major League Baseball and a presenting sponsor for the World Series.

== Legal actions ==
=== Fines for misleading customers to pay extra for services ===
In July 2012, Capital One was fined by the Office of the Comptroller of the Currency and the Consumer Financial Protection Bureau for misleading millions of its customers, for example by requiring customers to pay extra for payment protection or credit monitoring when they took out a card. The company agreed to pay $210 million to settle the legal action and to refund two million customers. This was the CFPB's first public enforcement action.

=== Automated dialing to customers' phones ===
In August 2014, Capital One and three collection agencies entered into an agreement to pay $75.5 million to end a consolidated class action lawsuit pending in the United States District Court for the Northern District of Illinois alleging that the companies used an automated dialer to call customers' cellphones without consent, which is a violation of the Telephone Consumer Protection Act of 1991. This legal action involved informational telephone calls, which are not subject to the "prior express written consent" requirements in place for telemarketing calls since October 2013.

=== July 2019 data breach ===
In July 2019, in one of the largest data breaches of personal information, Capital One found unauthorized access had occurred by an individual who had breached the account and identity security of 106 million people in the United States and Canada.

The FBI arrested Paige Thompson, who had previously worked as a software engineer for Amazon Web Services, a cloud computing hosting company used by Capital One. Thompson had accessed about 140,000 Social Security numbers, a million Canadian Social insurance numbers; 80,000 bank account numbers, and an unknown number of names and addresses of customers. Capital One began offering free credit report monitoring services and identity theft protection to those affected by the breach. It was ultimately determined there was no evidence the data was shared by Thompson.

Amazon stated that the security vulnerability used to access the Capital One records could have been discovered by anyone, the information that facilitated her activity was not gained from work at Amazon, and that she gained access via "a misconfiguration of the (Capital One-designed) web application and not the underlying (Amazon-designed) cloud-based infrastructure".

In 2022, Thompson was convicted of five felonies and two misdemeanors. She was sentenced to time served and five years of probation.

Capital One was alerted to the breach on July 17, 2019, 12 days before it was publicly acknowledged. Several Capital One customers stated that the first time they heard about the hack was through the media and the bank did not disclose the breach or explain its implications to affected customers. On social media and in the mainstream press, Capital One's contradictory July 2019 press statement was mocked for saying "No bank account numbers or Social Security numbers were compromised," but then listing hundreds of thousands of bank account numbers and Social Security numbers that were compromised.

In August 2020, the Federal Reserve Board of Governors announced a cease and desist order against Capital One resulting from the data breach. The order mandated, among other things, significant improvements in Capital One's governance, risk management and compliance (GRC) practices. The Federal Reserve ended the enforcement action in 2023.

Lawsuits were filed against Capital One and its employees in federal and circuit courts.

=== Understatement of losses ===
The U.S. Securities and Exchange Commission alleged that Capital One understated auto loan losses during the 2008 financial crisis. In 2013, Capital One paid $3.5 million to settle the case, but was not required to directly address the allegations of wrongdoing.

=== Bank fraud, money laundering, and possible racketeering ===
In 2018, Capital One was fined $100 million by the Office of the Comptroller of the Currency for failure to monitor, detect, and prevent money laundering. The bank allegedly failed to file suspicious activity reports, had deficiencies in its risk assessment, remote deposit capture, and generally had weaknesses that compromised national bank security controls. The bank was the subject of a larger investigation that alleged funds were siphoned out of US jurisdiction to safe havens.

In January 2021, Capital One was fined $390 million by FINCEN for anti-money laundering control failure concerning a now-defunct small portfolio of check-cashing businesses that Capital One acquired around 2008 and sold in 2014. Capital One later admitted that it failed to file thousands of suspicious activity reports and lapsed on filing currency transaction reports on around 50,000 reportable cash transactions valued around $16 billion.

=== Alleged misleading interest rates on savings accounts ===
In July 2023, a lawsuit claimed that, since February 2013, the company unfairly began offering a savings account with higher yield but didn't tell legacy customers.

In January 2025, the Consumer Financial Protection Bureau sued Capital One for cheating savings account holders out of $2 billion by "deceptive, abusive and illegal" practices which obscured the difference between the high-interest "360 Performance Savings" accounts vs. low-interest "360 Savings" accounts; however, the following month, after Donald Trump became president of the United States, the suit was dropped.

The State of New York filed a similar lawsuit against Capital One in May 2025 on behalf of depositors promised "one of the country's highest interest rates" on their "360 Savings" accounts; however, they were only paid an annual interest rate of 0.30%; the higher rates were paid on the similarly-named "360 Performance Savings" accounts. The company agreed to a $425 million settlement, which was approved by a judge in April 2026.

=== Trump account closures ===
The Donald J. Trump Revocable Trust, into which Donald Trump had transferred his business assets in light of his presidencies, and 11 other plaintiffs sued Capital One in March 2025 for the closure of more than 300 years-old Trump-affiliated bank accounts in March 2021. The accounts were for a variety of Trump-branded businesses, including a golf course and a winery. The plaintiffs brought a case in Florida claiming unfair treatment and political motives following the January 6 attacks on the Capitol. However, there is no legal entitlement to a bank account in the USA, where such rules and regulations exist to protect the financial system. The bank gave the Trump companies months – extended several times – to move their money elsewhere, which they did, and "never publicized the termination decision nor its confidential internal process that brought about the closure". The case was dismissed by Judge Roy K. Altman in March 2026 on the grounds that the plaintiffs had ignored contractual provisions, which gave the bank the right to "close any account in our sole discretion at any time, for any or no reason and without notice to [the account holder]". The "without prejudice" ruling by Judge Altman, whom Trump had nominated in 2019, allowed the plaintiffs to refile.

An amended complaint was filed on July 17, 2026, adding a fraud claim over Capital One's silence about its justification. Large parts of the complaint, including a section titled "January 6, 2021: The Political Trigger," were placed under seal by court order. Capital One filed a second motion to dismiss on July 31, 2026, revealing for the first time that the closures followed "months of analysis and a careful review" by its anti-money laundering team of experts with "decades of law enforcement experience". Without accusing the plaintiffs of money laundering and without disclosing the review's findings, the bank asked the court to dismiss the case with prejudice to prevent another refiling. It separately asked the court to keep sealed parts of an exhibit which bore employee names, account numbers and unrelated pay details, citing the Bank Secrecy Act; the plaintiffs did not object to sealing the account numbers but contested other redactions.

Snopes confirmed that Capital One closed around 300 Trump accounts over money-laundering concerns, while noting the bank never disclosed proof of actual laundering. Capital One's filings put the number of account closures near 300, while the plaintiffs cited about 385. There were rumours circulating tying the closures to Trump's property sales to Russian buyers but Snopes found no evidence as to their veracity.
