= Albertina =

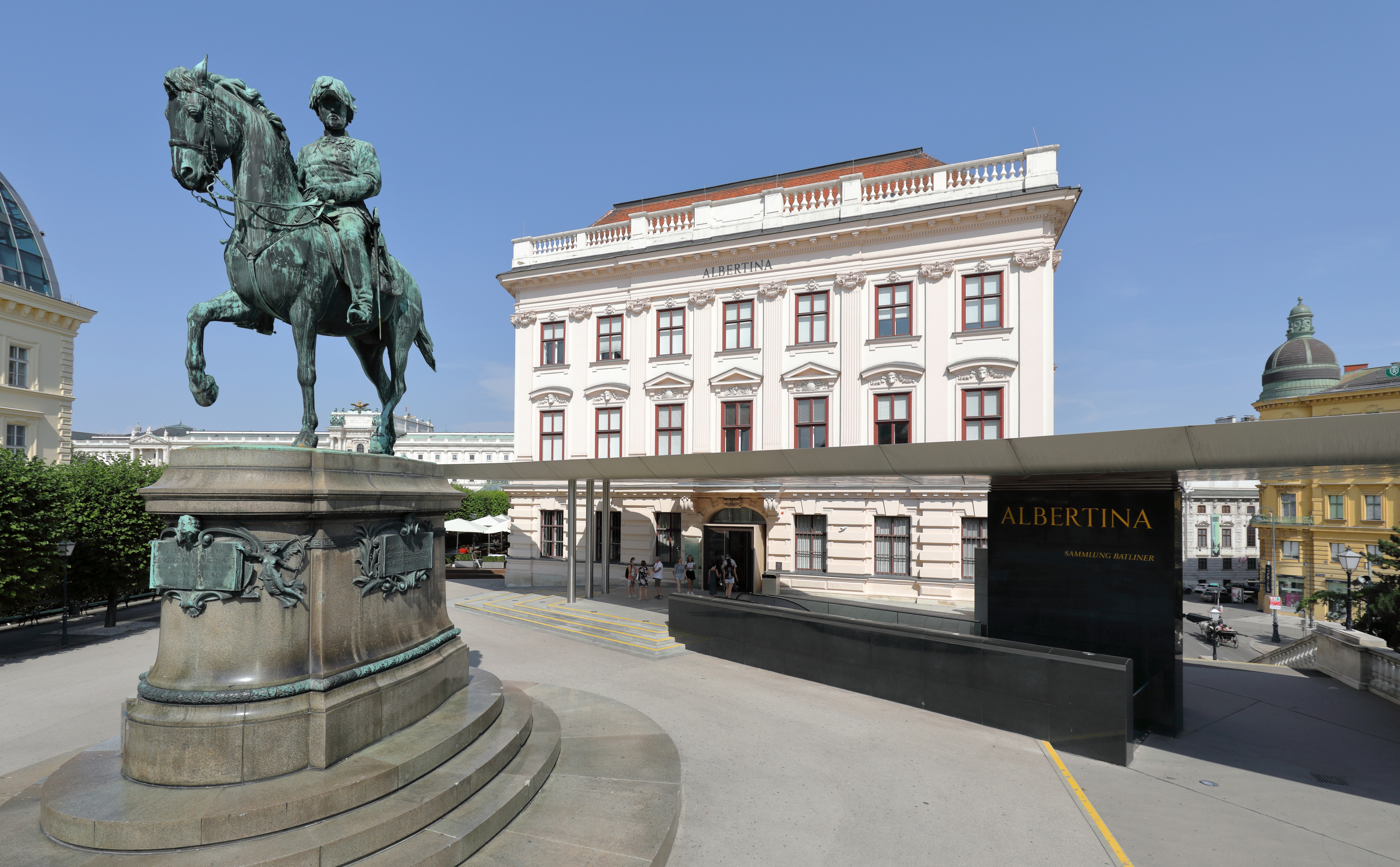
- Albertina with Archduke Albrecht Monument
- Established: 1805
- Location: Albertinaplatz 1, Vienna, Austria
- Coordinates: 48°12′17″N 16°22′6″E
- Type: Art museum
- Visitors: 360,073 (2020)
- Founder: Duke Albert Casimir
- Director: Ralph Gleis
- Website: www.albertina.at

The Albertina is a museum in the Innere Stadt (First District) of Vienna, Austria. It houses one of the largest and most important print rooms in the world with approximately 65,000 drawings and approximately 1 million old master prints, as well as more modern graphic works, photographs and architectural drawings. Apart from the graphics collection the museum has acquired, on permanent loan, two significant collections of Impressionist and early 20th-century art, some of which are on permanent display. The museum also houses temporary exhibitions. The museum had 1,037,347 visitors in 2025, down 3 percent from 2024, but up 4% from 2019, before the COVID-19 pandemic. It ranked 74th in the list of most-visited art museums in the world.

== History ==
The Albertina was erected on one of the last remaining sections of the fortifications of Vienna, the Augustinian Bastion. Originally, the Hofbauamt (Court Construction Office), which had been built in the second half of the 17th century, stood in that location. In 1744 it was refurbished by the director of the Hofbauamt, Emanuel Teles Count Silva-Tarouca, to become his palace; it was therefore also known as Palais Taroucca. The building was later taken over by Albert Casimir, Duke of Teschen, who used it as his residence. Albert later brought his graphics collection there from Brussels, where he had acted as the governor of the Habsburg Netherlands. He had the building extended by Louis Montoyer. Since then, the palace has immediately bordered the Hofburg. The collection was expanded by Albert's successors. When his grandson Archduke Albrecht, Duke of Teschen lived there until his death in 1895 it was called the Palais Erzherzog Albrecht.

The collection was created by Albert Casimir, Duke of Teschen with the Genoese count Giacomo Durazzo, the Austrian ambassador in Venice. In 1776 the count presented nearly 1,000 pieces of art to the duke and his wife Maria Christina (Maria Theresa's daughter). Count Durazzo, who was the brother of Marcello Durazzo, the Doge of Genoa – "wanted to create a collection for posterity that served higher purposes than all others: education and the power of morality should distinguish his collection...."

In the 1820s Archduke Charles, Duke Albert and Maria Christina's foster son, initiated further modifications to the building by Joseph Kornhäusel, which affected mostly its interior decoration. After Archduke Charles, his son Archduke Albert then Albrecht's nephew the popular Archduke Friedrich, Duke of Teschen lived in the building.

In early 1919, the new socialist government of Austria confiscated, without compensation, both the building and the collection belonging to the Archduke Friedrich and evicted him. In 1920 the collection of prints and drawings was united with the collection of the former Imperial court library. In 1921 the building was renamed The Albertina.

During the Nazi era, in particular after the "Anschluss" or merger with Nazi Germany in 1938, artworks stolen from Jewish collectors made their way into the Albertina collection. After the war, the museum fought against families' requests that the museum restitute works by Gustav Klimt, Egon Schiele and other artists. In 2015 the director of the Albertina called for a moratorium on claims. Research work continues by both families and the museum in order to identify looted artworks.

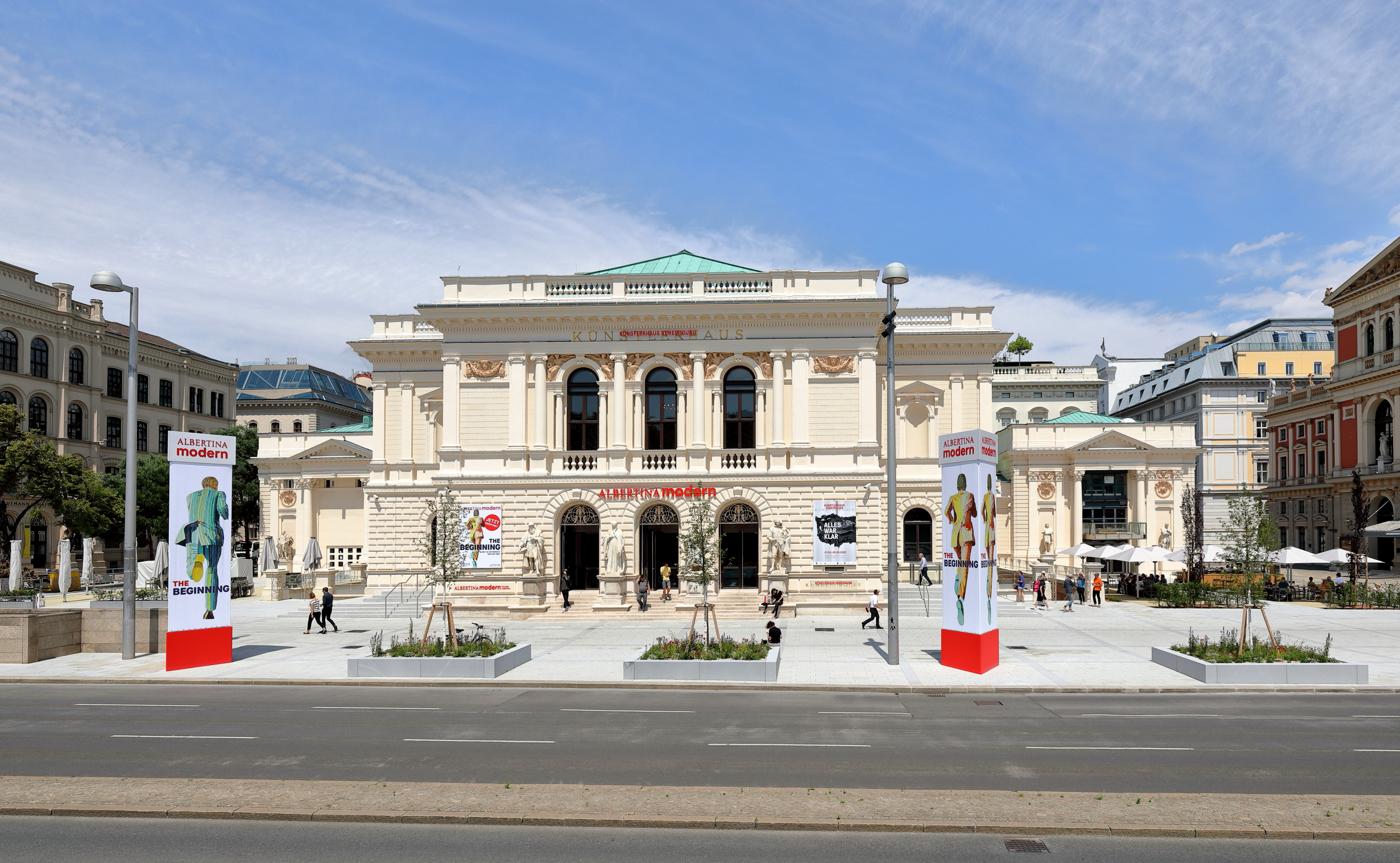
New museum "Albertina Modern" at Karlsplatz (2020)

In March 1945, the Albertina was heavily damaged by USAAF bomb attacks. The building was rebuilt in the years after the war and was completely refurbished and modernized from 1998 to 2003. Modifications of the exterior entrance sequence, including a distinctive roof by Hans Hollein were completed in 2008, when the graphics collection finally reopened. In 2018, the Albertina acquired the Essl Collection of 1,323 contemporary artworks, including pieces by Alex Katz, Cindy Sherman, Georg Baselitz, Hermann Nitsch, and Maria Lassnig.

Since 2007, the collection amassed by Rita and Herbert Batliner has been featured as a long term loan at the Albertina Museum.

On 27 May 2020, "Albertina modern" opened as a new museum for modern art. The collection of Albertina modern encompasses over 60,000 works by 5,000 artists. The Albertina Klosterneuburg opened in April 2024 and displays post-1945 works.

== Gallery ==
See also Category:Collection of the Albertina, Vienna.

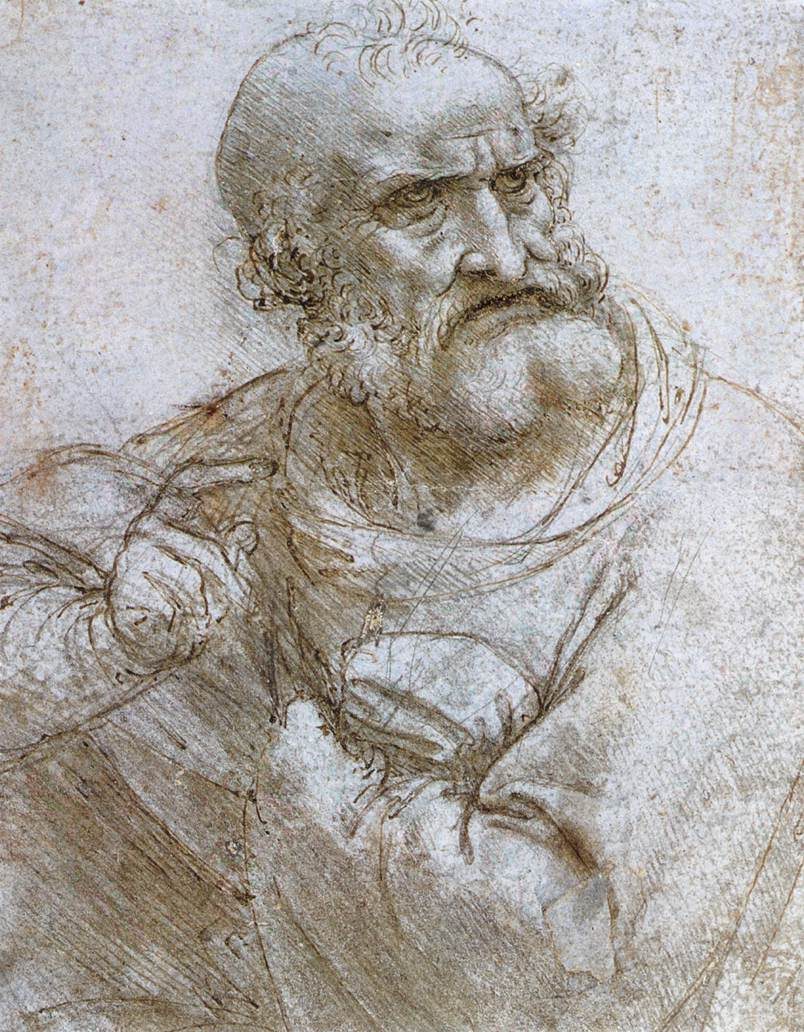
Study for the Last Supper by Leonardo da Vinci, c. 1495

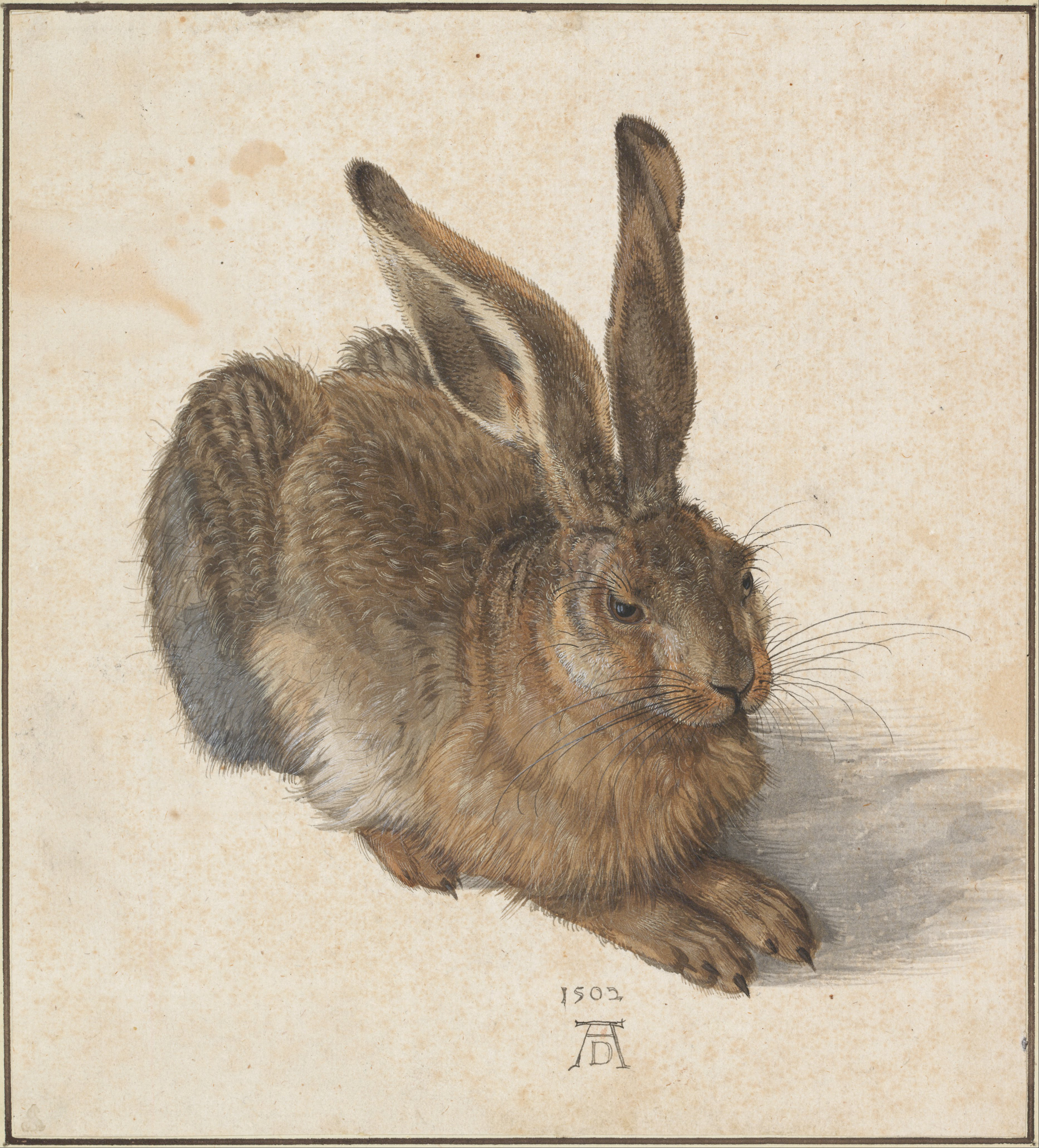
Young Hare by Albrecht Dürer (1502)

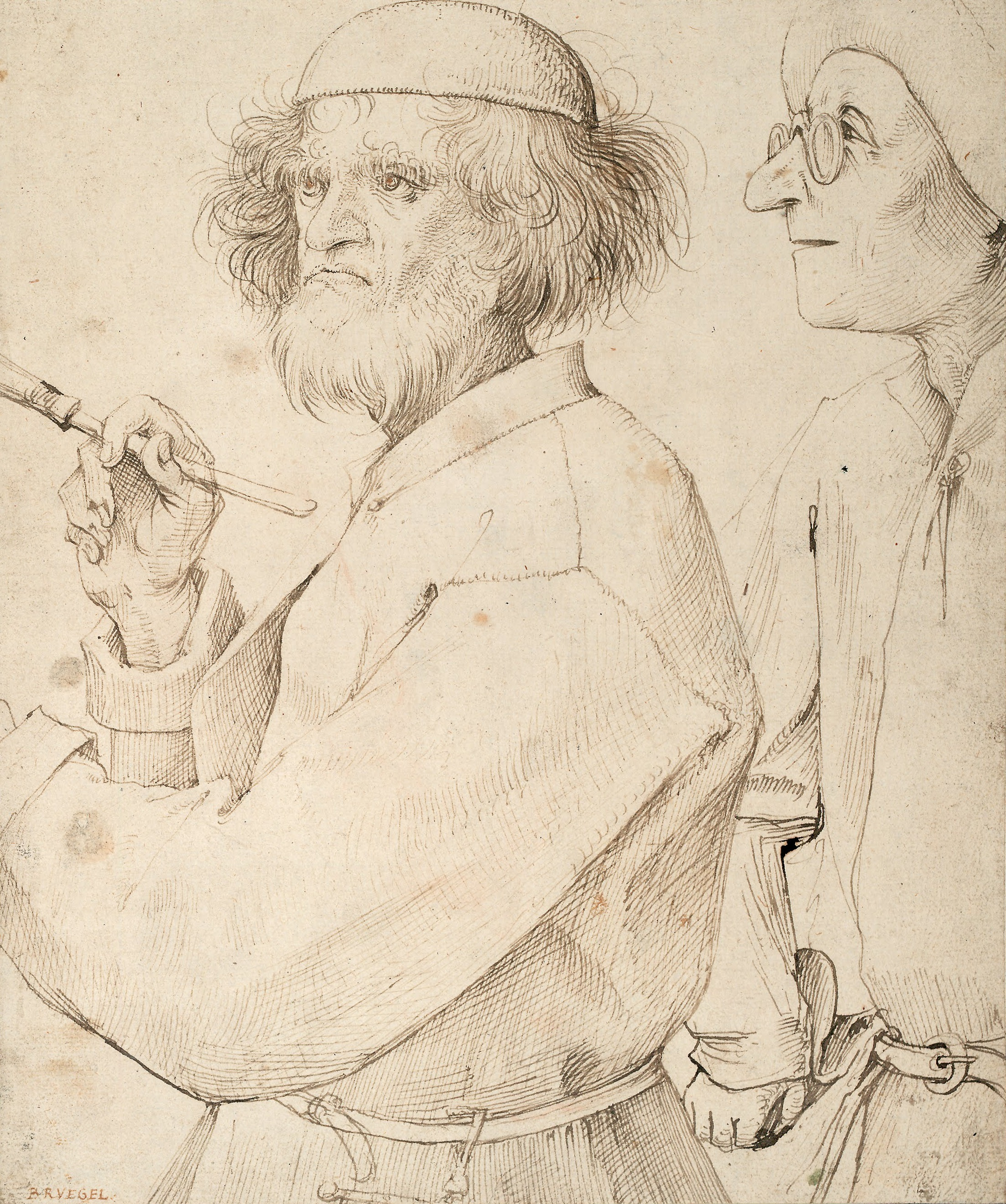
The Painter and The Buyer by Pieter Bruegel the Elder, 1565

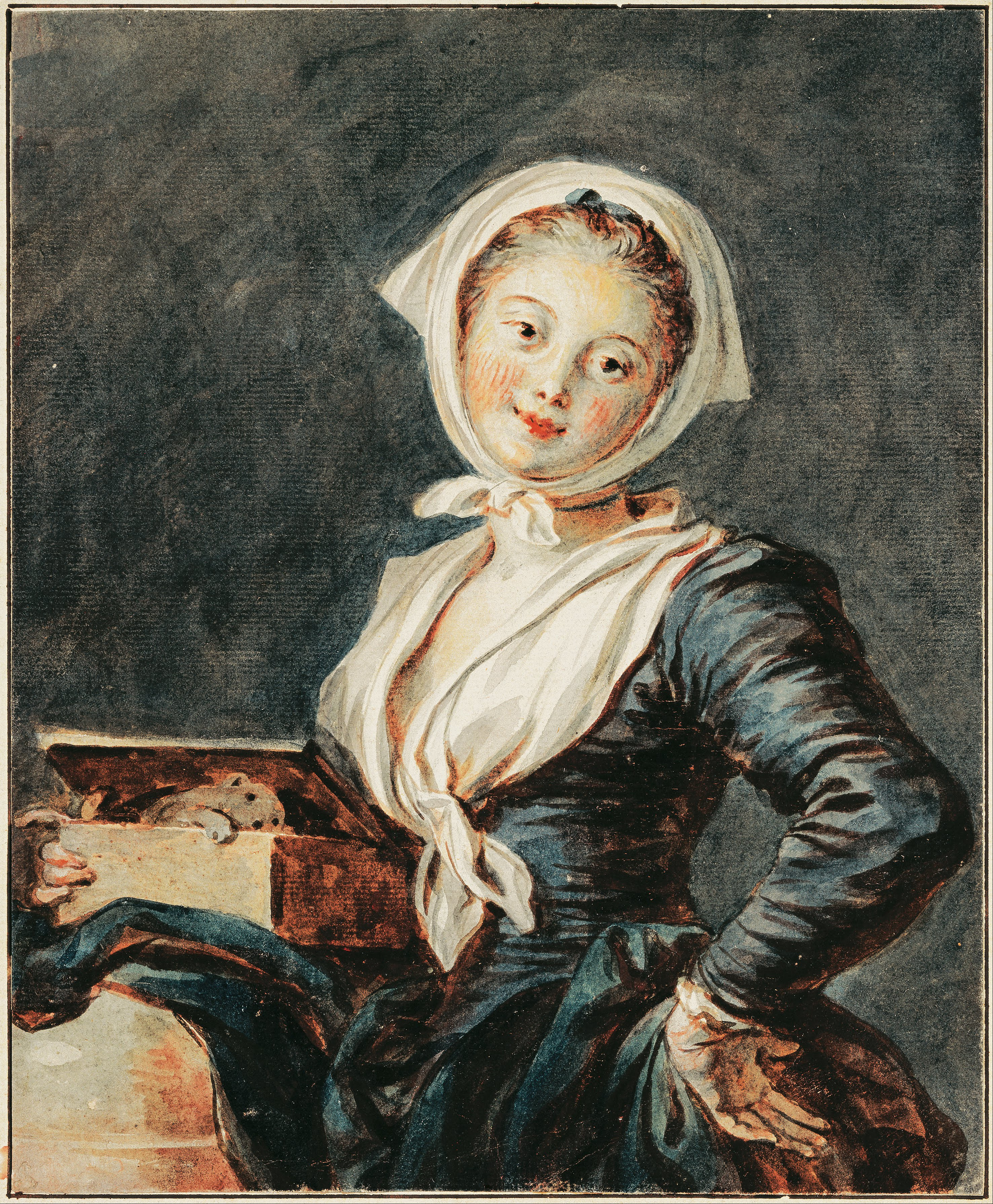
The Girl with the Marmot by Jean-Honoré Fragonard, undated

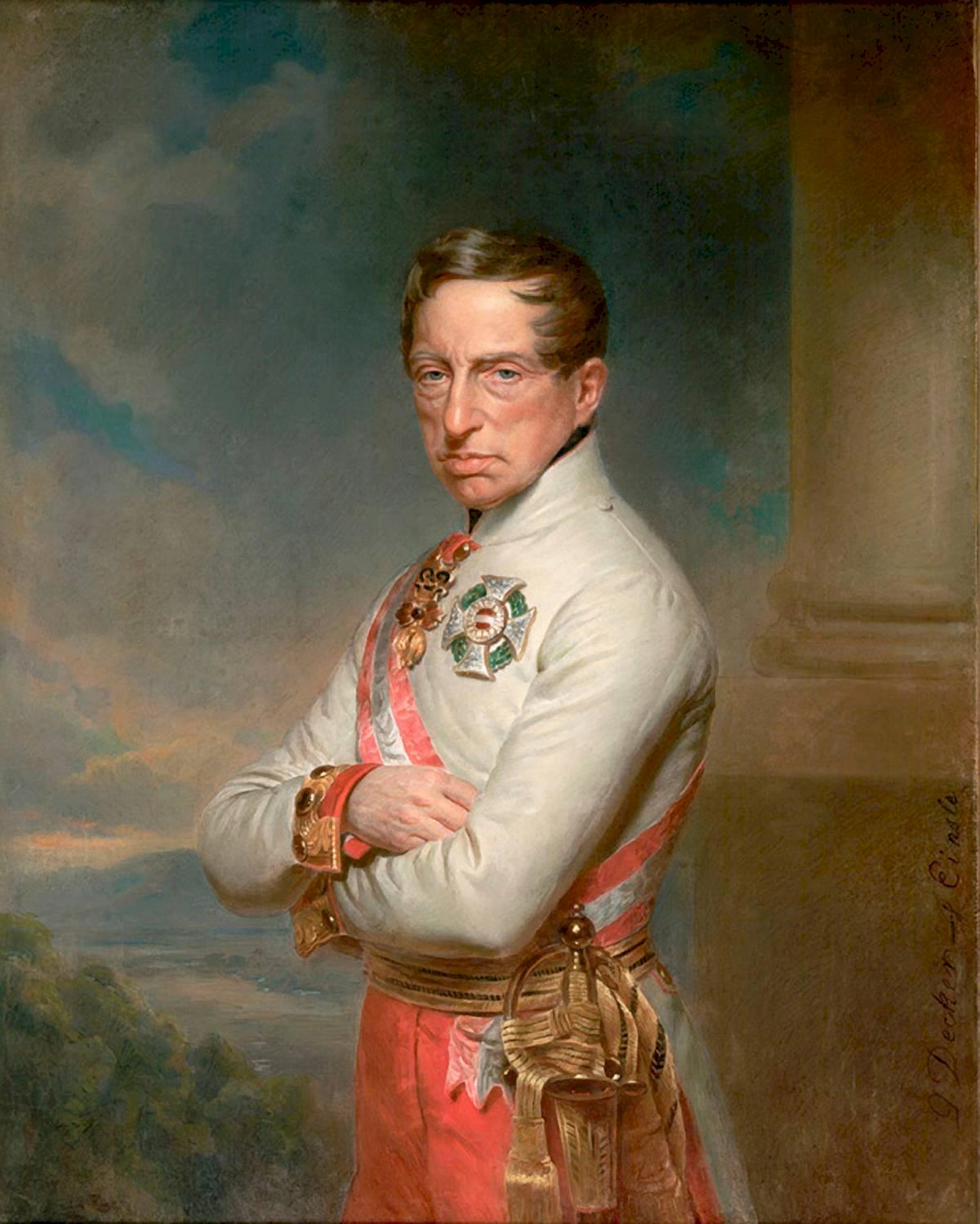
Archduke Charles, Duke of Teschen by Georg Decker, c. 1847

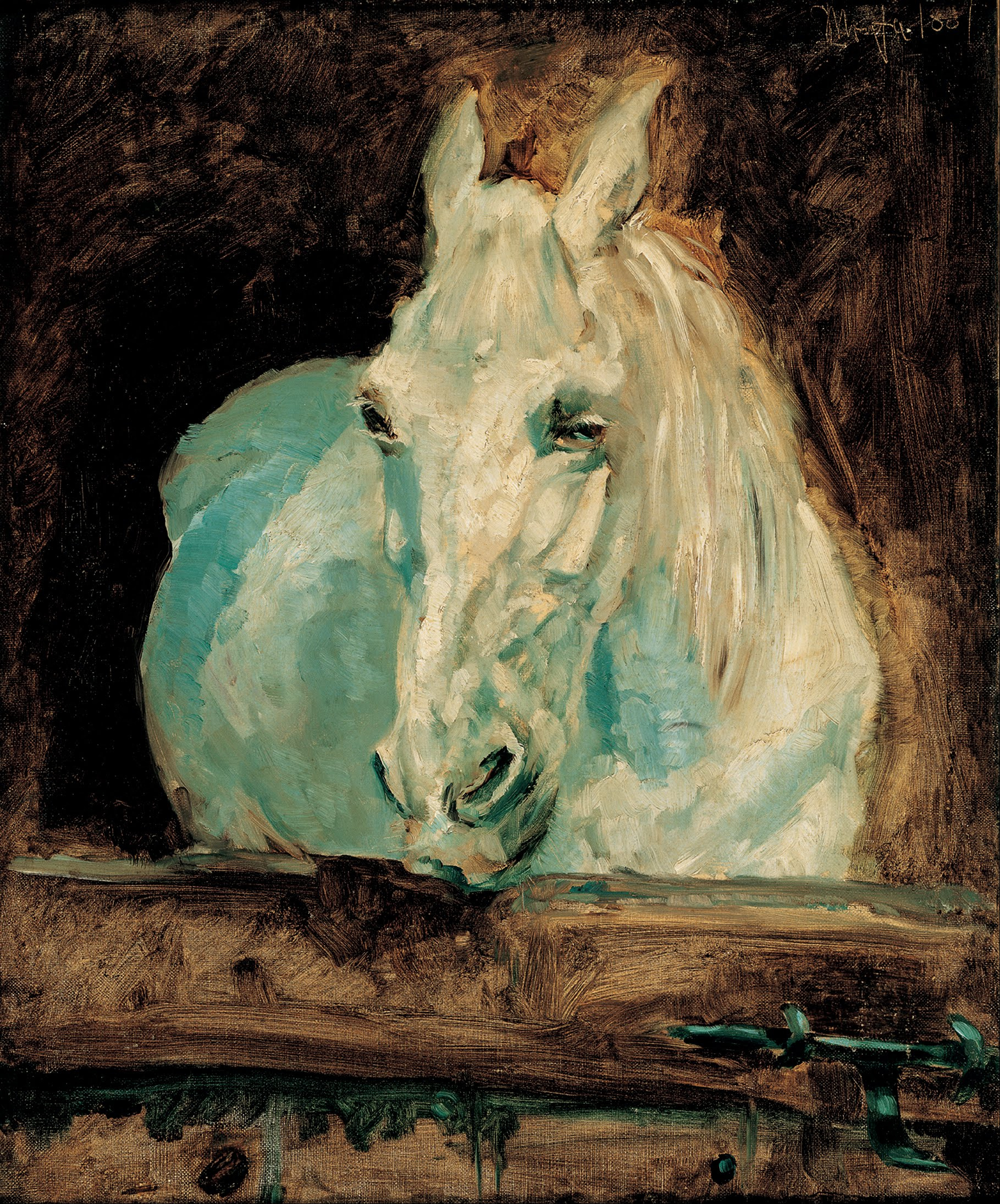
The White Horse "Gazelle" by Henri de Toulouse-Lautrec, 1881

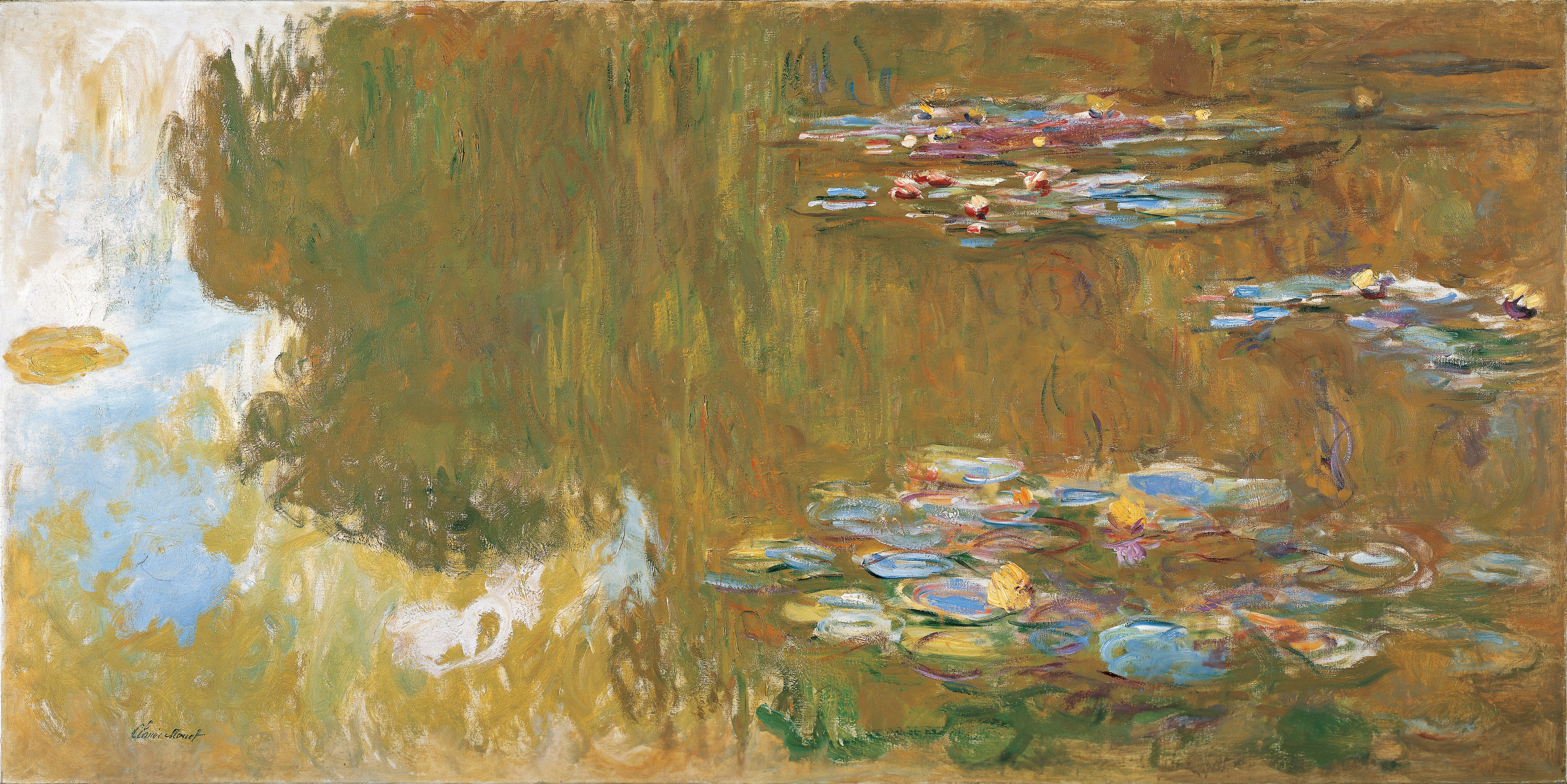
The Water Lily Pond, by Claude Monet, c. 1917–1919

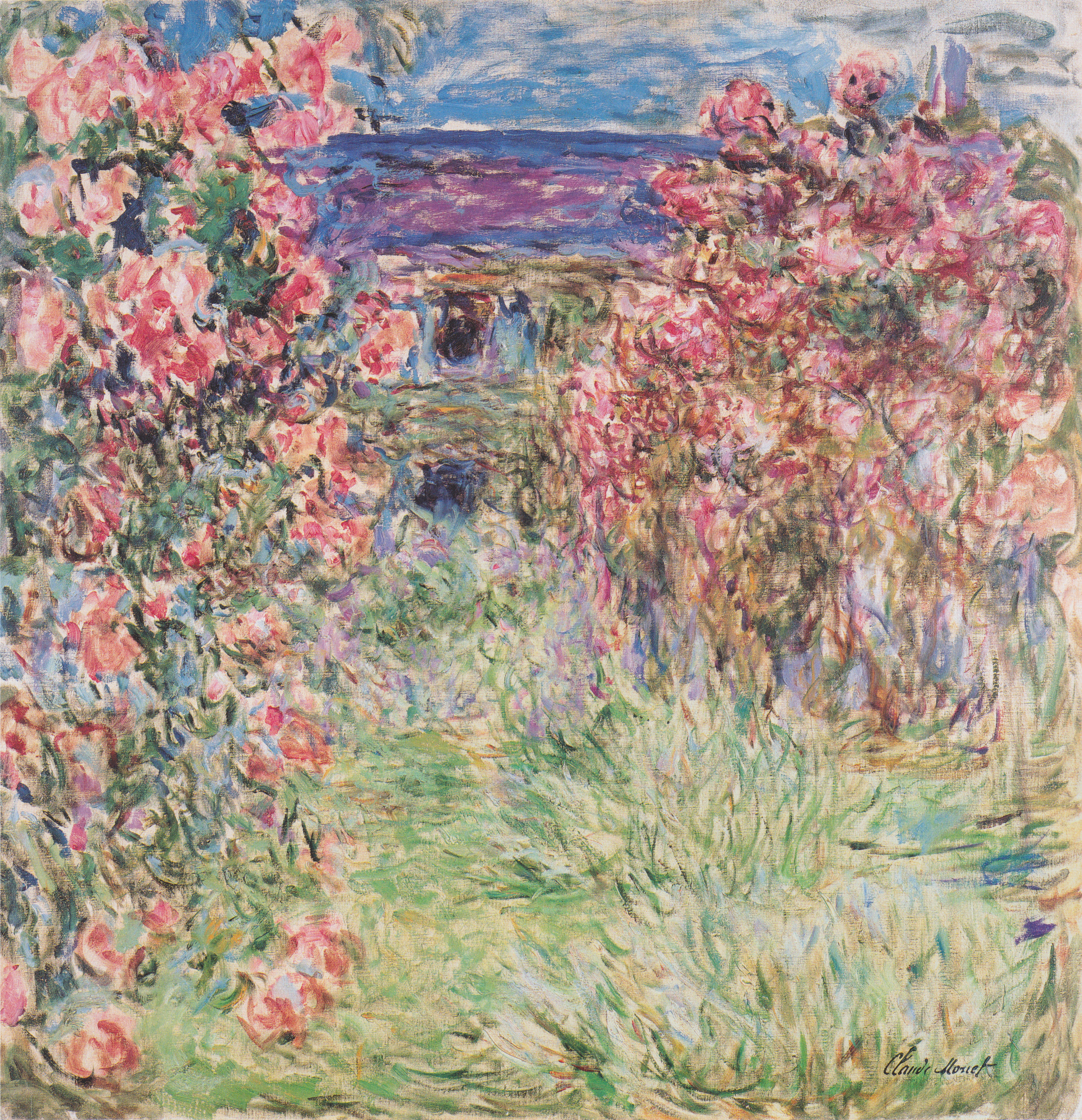
House Among the Roses by Claude Monet, c. 1918
