= The Painter and The Buyer =

Drawing by Pieter Bruegel the Elder

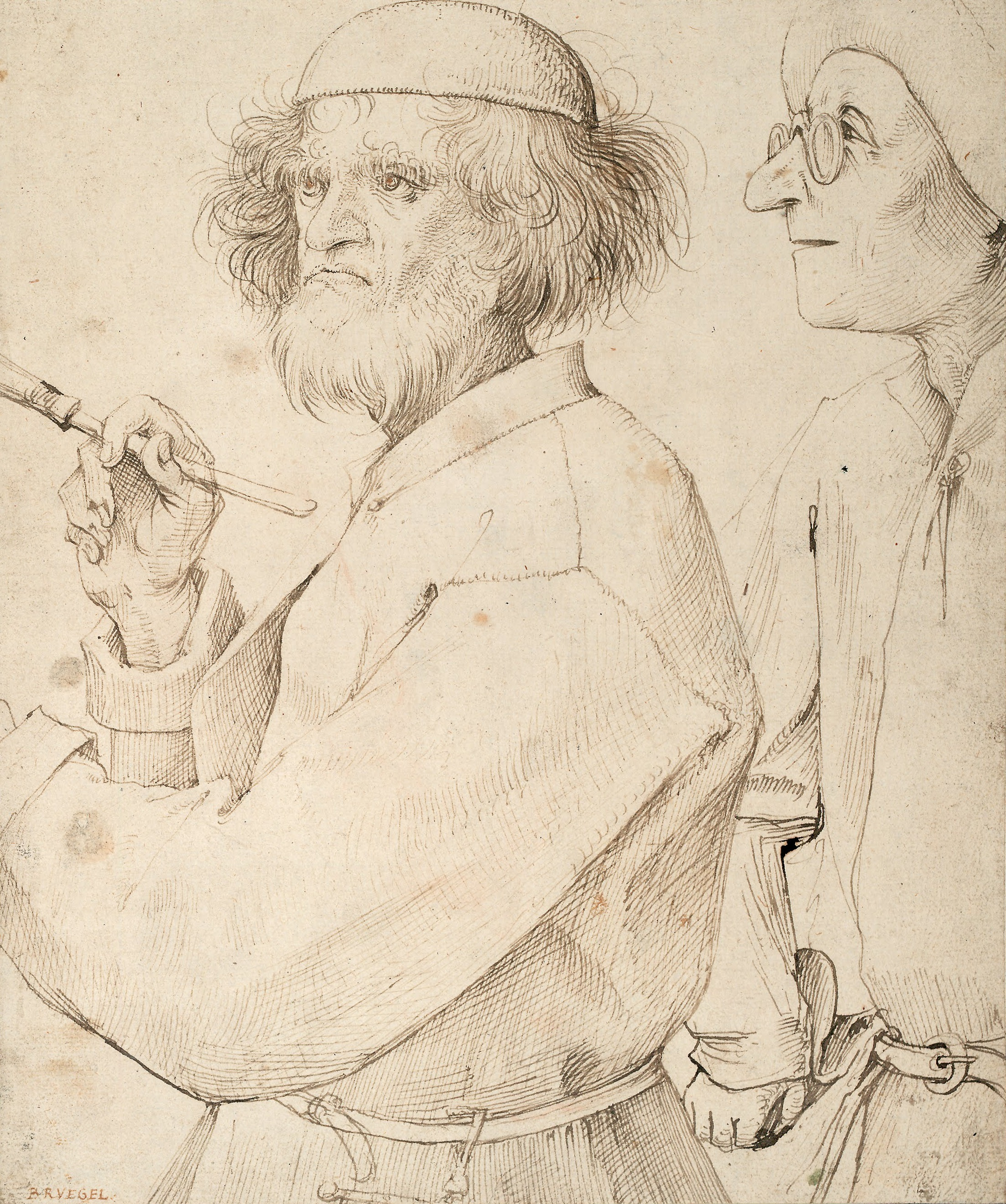
- Artist: Pieter Bruegel the Elder
- Year: 1565
- Type: Pen and ink on brown paper
- Dimensions: 25.5 cm × 25.1 cm (10.0 in × 9.9 in)
- Location: Albertina; Vienna

The Painter and The Buyer is a 1565 pen-and-ink on brown paper drawing by the Netherlandish Renaissance artist Pieter Bruegel the Elder. The alternative title is The Artist and The Connoisseur. The painter is thought to be a self-portrait of Pieter Bruegel the Elder.

== Content ==
The artist holds a paint brush in his right hand, on the left past the viewer, presumably to the object he paints. A second man looks over his shoulder at the resulting picture. This work is for the viewer, however, out of panel. Bruegel is limited entirely to the presentation of two dissimilar men: the painter drawn in detail with disheveled hair, bushy eyebrows and unkempt beard, and the more vague outline reproduced viewer behind him with pince-nez, long nose and mouth slightly open.

== Interpretation ==
In the Middle Ages, artists were fixed in a craft tradition supported by clients such as church, aristocracy and later the bourgeoisie. The depiction of painter and buyer or artist and connoisseur already reflects the new humanistic concept of art, which makes the painter dependent on the subjective judgement of a connoisseur. According to Hans Ost there is an "ignorant observer" who "with his mouth stupidly open, laboriously peers through his glasses over the artist's shoulder. This is the connoisseur and amateur, as we later find him in the circle of Roman antiquarians around Philipp von Stosch"

The identity of the painter, often assumed to be a self-portrait of Bruegel, is uncertain; it is also conceivable that its a portrait of Hieronymus Bosch.

== See also ==
- List of paintings by Pieter Bruegel the Elder
