= Objective self-awareness =

Sociopsychological theory

- Formation: 1972
- Experimental Social Psychologist: Shelley Duval and Robert Wicklund

Objective self-awareness is attention focused on the self as a socially evaluable object, as defined by Shelley Duval, Robert A. Wicklund, and other contemporary social psychologists.

Since the original debut of Duval and Wicklund's self-awareness theory in 1972, many experimental psychologists have refined theory and ideas concerning the causes and consequences of self-focused attention. Self-focused attention or self-awareness as often discussed in the context of social psychology refers to situational self-awareness, as opposed to dispositional self-focus. Dispositional self-focus more accurately relates to the construct of self-consciousness, which allows psychologists to measure individual differences in the tendency to think about and attend to the self.

== History and description ==
Prior to the development of the specific idea of objective self-awareness by Duval and Wicklund in the 1970s, psychologists, philosophers, and sociologists pursued scholarly work related to other relevant forms of self-referential mental processes. For example, William James, a founder of modern psychology, wrote about a wide array of self-focused processes in The Principles of Psychology and other scholarly publications. A specific area of interest of James was how we feel about ourselves. He wrote that self-esteem related feelings were partially determined by our personal goals and our perceived accomplishments, foreshadowing many similar lines of experimental research in contemporary personality and social psychology. Decades later, sociologist Charles Cooley and psychologist George Herbert Mead solidified a symbolic interactionist framework for examining the origin of the sense of self. Compared to James' earlier writings on self-esteem related feelings, Cooley and Mead's framework posited that a standard reference for behavioral comparison was not a personally derived goal per se, but was the socially derived perspective of a "generalized other". The perspective of the generalized other essentially represented an amalgamation of the many social standards imposed on an individual as he or she grows and matures in society.

Following in line with some but not all of the ideas of their theoretical predecessors, researchers Duval and Wicklund constructed one of the first coherent theories of self-awareness in psychology in 1972, written in their book A Theory of Objective Self-Awareness. Objective Self-awareness (OSA) theory described a self-system in which the locus of conscious attention automatically influenced one's levels of self-evaluation. In this original conceptualization, the scientists viewed the system as consisting of a self (a person's knowledge of themselves) and standards. Duval and Wicklund carefully clarified their use of the term "standards" in their 1972 book:

"Defined as a mental representation of correct behavior, attitudes, and traits...the standard of correctness taken together define what a 'correct' person is"

The psychological system elaborated by Duval and Wicklund was geared towards achieving internal consistency among its components, self and standards. When there was a discrepancy or difference between the self and certain relevant standards, a mental conflict emerged within the system. This was viewed as a state of negative affect, a state which had to be fixed or avoided. On one hand, the system could change its behavior and mental states to match the relevant standards; on the other hand, the system could avoid the conflict by escaping self-focus altogether, and thus halting the self-evaluation process. Duval and Wicklund's state of self-awareness therefore always correlated with negative affect. Other experimental researchers would later show that self-awareness could correlate with positive affect in certain situations.

== Links to cognitive processes ==
A large body of research literature has evolved focusing on the interplay of self-awareness, causal attribution, and action. Researchers have focused on how individuals perceive how involved they are in the cause of events leading to either success or failure. Experiments have shown that when people are induced to be more self-aware, they are more likely to attribute the success to themselves. In addition, they have higher self-esteem than individuals who have low self-awareness. On the other hand, failure attributions are somewhat more complicated. This complexity is due to the fact that researchers have found that either people's behavioral performance may be altered or the perception of the social standard may be changed in the event of a self-discrepancy. One study specifically found that highly self-aware individuals only attributed failure to themselves when they thought that they had a reasonable opportunity to change their behavioral performance and succeed later.

Other lines of research have examined how objective self-awareness relates to moral decision making. Batson and colleagues explored research looking at how changing self-focused attention and the salience of a moral standard affected judgments related to fairness. Participants in the study were asked to make a decision about giving a rewarding outcome, called the "positive consequences" task, to themselves or another person. Only when made to be feel self-focused and the presence of the moral standard was salient were the participants highly likely (about 92% of the time) to give the other person the positive rewarding outcome which aligned with the supposed "fair" decision option. In relation to empathy, Gerace and colleagues examined the relationship between self-reflection—including objective self-awareness and the trait of private self-consciousness—and perspective taking. In their review of the literature, these researchers argued that in studies where participants are made self-aware, they exhibit behaviours indicative of considering another person's point of view.

== Links to executive and regulation processes ==
One way in which people deal with self-focus is through reduction of self-standard discrepancies. As stated prior, people's perceptions of their standards may also change during the course of self-regulation when encountering failure. An experiment has found that when individuals are highly self-focused and attend to a behavioral standard, they are likely to see the standard in a negative light following failure than are other individuals. Moreover, they are more likely to change the perception of the behavioral standard to correspond to their performance and are not as likely to try to better their performance on a second try.

Another line of research proposes another way by which people's behavior changes as a result of self-focused attention. If the reduction of self-standard discrepancy seems inefficient or impossible, people will often seek to avoid or escape self-awareness altogether. Studies examine these psychological processes by examining how people react to demanding tasks. Research has found that self-focused people that deem their rate of progress on a task unacceptable will be more likely to avoid the task goals and therefore escape states of task driven self-awareness. On the other hand, people that deemed their efforts to diminish the self-standard discrepancy potentially effective were more likely to persist.

== Links to affect and motivation ==
Early conceptualizations of links between affect and objective self-awareness have evolved due to careful experimentation in social psychology. The original conceptualization of objective self-awareness theory proposed by Duval and Wicklund suggested that a state of self-focused attention was an aversive state. That is, when people are drawn to focus on themselves like an external evaluator would, they are more likely to develop a negative mood state. An early experiment following the original writing showed that the relationship between self-focus and mood is more complex than originally thought. The study showed that the intensity of negative mood experienced related to how participants perceived the discrepancy between their current behavior and the social standard; for participants that thought the discrepancy between behavior and standard was unchangeable, they were much more likely to experience negative affect.

Other theoretical approaches suggest that interplay of self-focus and affect depends largely on the type of behavioral standard being emphasized. In particular, research using self-discrepancy theory developed by Tory Higgins focuses on two types of standards, ought and ideal standards. Ought standards represent self-states that relate to other's beliefs about the responsibilities or duties. Ideal standards represent self-states that relate to an individual's goals or ambitions. Mismatching of self (current behavior) to either of these standards leads to different stereotyped affective behaviors. While being self-focused, a perceived discrepancy between current behavior and the ought standard will elicit feelings of agitation or anxiety. On the other hand, while being self-focused, a perceived discrepancy between current behavior and the ideal standard will lead to feelings of dejection and disappointment.

== See also ==
- Animal awareness
- Bicameral mentality
- Boltzmann brain
- Cartesian theater
- Childhood amnesia
- Confidence
- Dunning–Kruger effect
- Feldenkrais Method
- Higher consciousness
- Human self-reflection
- Insight in psychology and psychiatry
- Lucid dreaming
- Memory suppression
- Mindfulness
- Mirror test
- Modesty
- Outline of self
- Psychological mindedness
- Self-consciousness
- Self-knowledge (psychology)
- Sentience
- Vedanta
- Vipassanā
- Yoga Nidra
