= Heini Hediger =

Swiss zoologist (1908–1992)

- Born: 30 November 1908; Basel, Switzerland
- Died: 29 August 1992 (aged 83); Bern, Switzerland
- Occupation: Biologist

Heini Hediger (30 November 1908 – 29 August 1992) was a Swiss biologist noted for work in proxemics in animal behavior and is known as the "father of zoo biology". Hediger was formerly the director of Tierpark Dählhölzli (1938–1943), Zoo Basel (1944–1953) and Zürich Zoo (1954–1973).

== Psychology ==
Hediger described a number of standard interaction distances used in one form or another between animals. Two of these are flight distance and critical distance, used when animals of different species meet, whereas others are personal distance and social distance, observed during interactions between members of the same species. Hediger's biological social distance theories were used as a basis for Edward T. Hall's 1966 anthropological social distance theories.

In the 1950s, psychologist Humphry Osmond developed the concept of socio-architecture hospital design, such as was used in the design of the Weyburn mental hospital in 1951, based partly on Hediger's species-habitat work.

== Zoo biology ==
In 1942 Heini Hediger developed the science of wild animals kept in human care and published his concept of a new, special branch of biology, called “zoo biology”. The main statement is that animals in zoos are not to be considered as “captives” but as “owners of property”, namely the territory of their enclosures. They mark and defend this territory as they do in the natural environment and if the enclosures contain these elements which are of importance to them also in their natural environment, they have neither need nor desire to leave this property, but to the contrary, stay within it, even when they would have the opportunity to escape, or return to this “safe haven”, should they by accident have escaped. He consequently emphasized that the quality of the enclosures (“furnishing”, structure) is equally, or even more important than quantity (space, dimensions) and substantiated this with observations in the natural habitat. Among many other things he made clear that animals in the natural habitat do not need huge spaces, and all their needs can be satisfied within close range, that, in fact, animals do not move about for pleasure but to satisfy their needs. Zoo biology therefore implies that the life of animals in their natural surroundings must be studied in order to provide them with appropriate keeping conditions in human care. In animal husbandry, the aim of this concept — guided by the maxim “changing cages into territories” — was to meet the biological and ethological requirements of the exhibited animals. Hediger's publications influenced the keeping of wild animals in human care in particular also in the construction of enclosures and the planning of zoos.

In the 1950s, he began promoting the concept of training zoo animals to elicit biologically suitable behavior and to afford the animal exercise and mental occupation. Further, he observed that in some cases training increased the opportunity for the zookeeper to give needed medical treatments to the animal. He also referred to zoo animal training as “disciplined play”.

In the 1940s he defined the four main tasks of zoos:

1. Recreation
2. Education
3. Research
4. Conservation

In the 1960s, he defined the seven aspects of a zoological garden considering people, money, space, methods, administration, animals and research, in that order.

He reintroduced the new concept of zoo biology and dealt with such matters as food, causes of death, zoo architecture, the meaning of animal to man and man to animal, the exhibition value of animals, and the behavior of humans in zoos.

== Eponyms ==
The frog species Platymantis guppyi was renamed Cornufer hedigeri in 2015, to honor Hediger's merit in the field of taxonomy of frogs and herpetological research in the Southern Pacific in 1931–1932. Also named after Hediger are the praying mantis genus Hedigerella, the land snail Japonia hedigeri, and the venomous snake Parapistocalamus hedigeri.

== Quotes ==
"Hunger and love" can take only second place. The satisfaction of hunger and sexual appetite can be postponed; not so escape from a dangerous enemy, and all animals, even the biggest and fiercest, have enemies. As far as higher animals are concerned, escape must thus at any rate be considered as the most important behavior biologically.

== Hediger's works ==
- Hediger, Heini (1942). Wildtiere in Gefangenschaft. Basel: Benno Schwabe & Co. English edition: Hediger, Heini (1950). Wild Animals in Captivity. Translated by G. Sircom. London: Butterworth.
- Hediger, Heini (1955). Studies of the psychology and behaviour of captive animals in zoos and circuses. London: Butterworths Scientific Publications. ASIN B0007IXEUS. (German edition: Zirich, Buechergilde Gutenberg, 1954)
- Hediger, Heini (1964). Wild Animals in Captivity. Dover Publications.
- Hediger, Heini (1969). Man and Animal in the Zoo. London: Routledge & Kegan Paul.

== Literature about him ==
- Sebeok, Thomas A. (2001). The Swiss Pioneer in Nonverbal Communication Studies: Heini Hediger (1908–1992). New York: Legas.
- Turovski, Aleksei (2000). "The semiotics of animal freedom: A zoologist’s attempt to perceive the semiotic aim of H. Hediger". Sign Systems Studies 28: 380–387.

== See also ==
- Biosemiotics
- Bernhard Grzimek
