= August 4 =

August 4 this year in various calendars
- Tuesday, 4 August 2026
Akan	Nwonabene
Armenian	15 Nawasardi 1476
Aztec	Pānquetzaliztli 6, 12 Ocēlōtl
Babylonian	20 Du'uzu, 2337 SE
Balinese pawukon	Menga, Beteng, Menala, Pon, Aryang, Anggara of Merakih, Uma, Jangur, Pandita
Bengali	20 Shrabon, BS 1433
Chinese	Yang Metal Dog・Encampment Mansion; Fire Horse Year, Month 6, Day 22 (Dashu, 3 days until Liqiu)
Common Era	4 August 2026 CE
Coptic	28 Epip, AM 1742
Egyptian	20 Choiak, 2775 NE
Ethiopian	28 Ḥamlē, 2018 Amätä Məhrät
French Republican	Décade II, Septidi de Thermidor de l'Année 234 de la République
Gregorian	4 August, AD 2026
Hebrew	21 Av, AM 5786
Hindu	Revatī・Dhṛti; Solar: 19 Śrāvaṇa, 1948 SE; Lunisolar: Ṣaṣṭhī, Kṛishna pakṣa of Āṣāḍha, 2083 VE; Rāudra・5127 KY・1,872,791
Icelandic	Þriðjudagur, 10 Heyannir 2026
Islamic	19 Safar, AH 1448 (using tabular method)
ISO week date	2026-W32-2
Japanese	22 Minazuki, Reiwa 8 (Taisho, 3 days until Risshū)
Julian	22 July, AD 2026 (AM 7534)
Julian day	2461257
Korean	22 Yangdal, 4359 DE
Maya	13.0.13.14.14; 7 Yaxkin, 12 Ix
Roman	ante diem XI Kalendas Augustas, MMDCCLXXIX AUC
Solar Hijri	13 Mordad, SH 1405
Tibetan	21 chu stod, me pho rta 2153 or 1772 or 1000

<<	August					>>
Su	Mo	Tu	We	Th	Fr	Sa
						1
2	3	4	5	6	7	8
9	10	11	12	13	14	15
16	17	18	19	20	21	22
23	24	25	26	27	28	29
30	31
2026

August 4 in recent years
2026 (Tuesday)
2025 (Monday)
2024 (Sunday)
2023 (Friday)
2022 (Thursday)
2021 (Wednesday)
2020 (Tuesday)
2019 (Sunday)
2018 (Saturday)
2017 (Friday)

August 4 is the 216th day of the year (217th in leap years) in the Gregorian calendar; 149 days remain until the end of the year.

== Events ==
=== Pre-1600 ===
- 70 BC – The trial against Gaius Verres for corruption is opened, with Marcus Tullius Cicero as prosecutor and renowned orator Quintus Hortensius as defending lawyer.
- 598 – Goguryeo-Sui War: In response to a Goguryeo (Korean) incursion into Liaoxi, Emperor Wéndi of Sui orders his youngest son, Yang Liang (assisted by the co-prime minister Gao Jiong), to conquer Goguryeo during the Manchurian rainy season, with a Chinese army and navy.
- 1265 – Second Barons' War: Battle of Evesham: The army of Prince Edward (the future king Edward I of England) defeats the forces of rebellious barons led by Simon de Montfort, 6th Earl of Leicester, killing de Montfort and many of his allies.
- 1320 – The so-called Black Parliament at Scone tries William II de Soules and other nobles who had plotted against Robert I of Scotland and intended to place William on the Scottish throne.
- 1327 – First War of Scottish Independence: James Douglas leads a raid into Weardale and almost kills Edward III of England.
- 1578 – Battle of Al Kasr al Kebir: The Moroccans defeat the Portuguese but both the Moroccan king Abd al-Malik and the Portuguese king Sebastian die. Ahmad al-Mansur follows Abd al-Malik as sultan of Morocco while the death of Sebastian leads to a succession crisis in Portugal.

=== 1601–1900 ===
- 1693 – Date traditionally ascribed to Dom Perignon's invention of champagne; it is not clear whether he actually invented champagne, however he has been credited as an innovator who developed the techniques used to perfect sparkling wine.
- 1701 – Great Peace of Montreal between New France and First Nations is signed.
- 1704 – War of the Spanish Succession: Gibraltar is captured by an English and Dutch fleet, commanded by Admiral Sir George Rooke and allied with Archduke Charles.
- 1781 – Fourth Anglo-Dutch War, a fleet of six East India Company ships sets sail from Fort Marlborough to raid the Dutch VOC factories on the West coast of Sumatra including the major port of Padang.
- 1783 – Mount Asama erupts in Japan, killing about 1,400 people (Tenmei eruption). The eruption causes a famine, which results in an additional 20,000 deaths.
- 1789 – France: abolition of feudalism by the National Constituent Assembly.
- 1790 – A newly passed tariff act creates the Revenue Cutter Service (the forerunner of the United States Coast Guard).
- 1791 – The Treaty of Sistova is signed, ending the Ottoman–Habsburg wars.
- 1796 – French Revolutionary Wars: Napoleon leads the French Army of Italy to victory in the Battle of Lonato.
- 1814 – War of 1812: The ultimately unsuccessful Siege of Fort Erie begins as British forces attempt to recapture the fort and drive American forces out of Canada.
- 1821 – The Saturday Evening Post is published for the first time as a weekly newspaper.
- 1854 – The Hinomaru is established as the official flag to be flown from Japanese ships.
- 1863 – Matica slovenská, Slovakia's public-law cultural and scientific institution focusing on topics around the Slovak nation, is established in Martin.
- 1873 – American Indian Wars: While protecting a railroad survey party in Montana, the United States 7th Cavalry, under Lieutenant Colonel George Armstrong Custer clashes for the first time with the Cheyenne and Lakota people near the Tongue River; only one man on each side is killed.
- 1887 – Granny, a sea anemone, died in Edinburgh after nearly 60 years in captivity. Her death was reported in The Scotsman and The New York Times.
- 1889 – The Great Fire of Spokane, Washington destroys some 32 blocks of the city, prompting a mass rebuilding project.
- 1892 – The father and stepmother of Lizzie Borden are found murdered in their Fall River, Massachusetts home. She will be tried and acquitted for the crimes a year later.

=== 1901–present ===
- 1914 – World War I: In response to the German invasion of Belgium, Belgium and the British Empire declare war on Germany. The United States declares its neutrality.
- 1915 – World War I: The German 12th Army occupies Warsaw during the Gorlice–Tarnów Offensive and the Great Retreat of 1915.
- 1921 – Bolshevik–Makhnovist conflict: Mikhail Frunze declares victory over the Makhnovshchina.
- 1922 – Enver Pasha dies in a skirmish between the Bolshevik Red Army and Basmachi troops, to whom he had defected earlier.
- 1924 – Diplomatic relations between Mexico and the Soviet Union are established.
- 1936 – Prime Minister of Greece Ioannis Metaxas suspends parliament and the Constitution and establishes the 4th of August Regime.
- 1944 – The Holocaust: A tip from a Dutch informer leads the Gestapo to a sealed-off area in an Amsterdam warehouse, where they find and arrest Jewish diarist Anne Frank, her family, and four others.
- 1944 – Under the state of emergency law, the Finnish Parliament elects Marshal C. G. E. Mannerheim as the President of Finland to replace the resigned Risto Ryti.
- 1946 – An earthquake of magnitude 8.0 hits northern Dominican Republic. One hundred are killed and 20,000 are left homeless.
- 1947 – The Supreme Court of Japan is established.
- 1964 – Civil rights movement: Civil rights workers Michael Schwerner, Andrew Goodman and James Chaney are found dead in Mississippi after disappearing on June 21.
- 1964 – Second Gulf of Tonkin Incident: U.S. destroyers USS Maddox and USS Turner Joy mistakenly report coming under attack in the Gulf of Tonkin.
- 1965 – The Constitution of the Cook Islands comes into force, giving the Cook Islands self-governing status within New Zealand.
- 1969 – Vietnam War: At the apartment of French intermediary Jean Sainteny in Paris, American representative Henry Kissinger and North Vietnamese representative Xuân Thuỷ begin secret peace negotiations. The negotiations will eventually fail.
- 1972 – Ugandan President Idi Amin announces that Uganda is no longer responsible for the care of British subjects of Asian origin, beginning the expulsions of Ugandan Asians.
- 1974 – A bomb explodes in the Italicus Express train at San Benedetto Val di Sambro, Italy, killing 12 people and wounding 22.
- 1975 – The Japanese Red Army takes more than 50 hostages at the AIA Building housing several embassies in Kuala Lumpur, Malaysia. The hostages include the U.S. consul and the Swedish Chargé d'affaires. The gunmen win the release of five imprisoned comrades and fly with them to Libya.
- 1977 – U.S. President Jimmy Carter signs legislation creating the United States Department of Energy.
- 1983 – Jean-Baptiste Ouédraogo, president of the military government of Upper Volta, is ousted from power in a coup d'état led by Captain Thomas Sankara.
- 1984 – The Republic of Upper Volta changes its name to Burkina Faso.
- 1984 – The Ariane 3 rocket is launched for the first time, carrying the Eutelsat I F-2 and Télécom 1A satellites into geosynchronous transfer orbit.
- 1987 – The Federal Communications Commission rescinds the Fairness Doctrine which had required radio and television stations to give equal time to opposing views.
- 1995 – Operation Storm, the last major battle of the Croatian War of Independence begins.
- 2006 – A massacre is carried out by Sri Lankan government forces, killing 17 employees of the French INGO Action Against Hunger (known internationally as Action Contre la Faim, or ACF).
- 2007 – NASA's Phoenix Mars lander is launched.
- 2018 – Syrian civil war: The Syrian Democratic Forces (SDF) expel the Islamic State of Iraq and the Levant (ISIL) from the Iraq–Syria border, concluding the second phase of the Deir ez-Zor campaign.
- 2018 – Crisis in Venezuela: Seven people are injured when two drones detonate explosives on Avenida Bolívar, Caracas while president Nicolás Maduro is giving a speech to the Venezuelan National Guard.
- 2019 – Nine people are killed and 26 injured in a shooting in Dayton, Ohio. This comes only 13 hours after another mass shooting in El Paso, Texas, where 23 people were killed.
- 2020 – Beirut Port explosion: At least 220 people are killed and over 5,000 are wounded when 2,700 tons of ammonium nitrate explodes in Beirut, Lebanon.

== Births ==
=== Pre-1600 ===
- 1222 – Richard de Clare, 6th Earl of Gloucester, English soldier (died 1262)
- 1281 – Külüg Khan, Emperor Wuzong of Yuan (died 1311)
- 1290 – Leopold I, Duke of Austria (died 1326)
- 1463 – Lorenzo di Pierfrancesco de' Medici, Florentine patron of the arts (died 1503)
- 1469 – Margaret of Saxony, Duchess of Brunswick-Lüneburg (died 1528)
- 1470 – Bernardo Dovizi, Italian cardinal (died 1520)
- 1470 – Lucrezia de' Medici, Italian noblewoman (died 1553)
- 1521 – Pope Urban VII (died 1590)
- 1522 – Udai Singh II, King of Mewar (died 1572)

=== 1601–1900 ===
- 1604 – François Hédelin, abbé d'Aubignac, French cleric and author (died 1676)
- 1623 – Friedrich Casimir, Count of Hanau-Lichtenberg (1641–1680) and Hanau-Münzenberg (1642–1680) (died 1685)
- 1701 – Thomas Blackwell, Scottish historian and scholar (died 1757)
- 1704 – Louis d'Orléans, Duke of Orléans (died 1752)
- 1719 – Johann Gottlob Lehmann, German mineralogist and geologist (died 1767)
- 1721 – Granville Leveson-Gower, 1st Marquess of Stafford, English politician, Lord President of the Council (died 1803)
- 1725 - John Newton, slaver turned Christian evangelist and author of “Amazing Grace”
- 1755 – Nicolas-Jacques Conté, French soldier, painter, balloonist, and inventor (died 1805)
- 1792 – Percy Bysshe Shelley, English poet and playwright (died 1822)
- 1805 – William Rowan Hamilton, Irish physicist, astronomer, and mathematician (died 1865)
- 1821 – Louis Vuitton, French fashion designer, founded Louis Vuitton (died 1892)
- 1821 – James Springer White, American religious leader, co-founded the Seventh-day Adventist Church (died 1881)
- 1834 – John Venn, English mathematician and philosopher (died 1923)
- 1836 – Jens Vilhelm Dahlerup, Danish architect (died 1907)
- 1839 – Walter Pater, English author, critic, and academic (died 1894)
- 1844 – Henri Berger, German composer and bandleader (died 1929)
- 1853 – John Henry Twachtman, American painter, etcher, and academic (died 1902)
- 1859 – Knut Hamsun, Norwegian novelist, poet, and playwright, Nobel Prize laureate (died 1952)
- 1861 – Daniel Edward Howard, 16th president of Liberia (died 1935)
- 1867 – Jake Beckley, American baseball player and coach (died 1918)
- 1868 – Master C. V. V., Indian philosopher, yogi and guru (died 1922)
- 1870 – Harry Lauder, Scottish actor and singer (died 1950)
- 1871 – William Holman, English-Australian politician, 19th Premier of New South Wales (died 1934)
- 1876 – Giovanni Giuriati, Italian lawyer and politician (died 1970)
- 1876 – John Scaddan, Australian politician, 10th Premier of Western Australia (died 1934)
- 1877 – Dame Laura Knight, English artist (died 1970)
- 1884 – Béla Balázs, Hungarian poet and critic (died 1949)
- 1884 – Henri Cornet, French cyclist (died 1941)
- 1887 – Albert M. Greenfield, Ukrainian-American businessman and philanthropist (died 1967)
- 1888 – Taher Saifuddin, Indian religious leader, 51st Da'i al-Mutlaq (died 1965)
- 1890 – Dolf Luque, Cuban baseball player and manager (died 1957)
- 1893 – Fritz Gause, German historian and curator (died 1973)
- 1898 – Ernesto Maserati, Italian race car driver and engineer (died 1975)
- 1899 – Ezra Taft Benson, American religious leader, 13th President of The Church of Jesus Christ of Latter-day Saints (died 1994)
- 1900 – Queen Elizabeth the Queen Mother, Queen Consort of King George VI of the United Kingdom, Empress Consort of India (died 2002)

=== 1901–present ===
- 1901 – Louis Armstrong, American trumpet player and singer (died 1971)
- 1902 – Bill Hallahan, American baseball player (died 1981)
- 1904 – Witold Gombrowicz, Polish author and playwright (died 1969)
- 1905 – Abeid Karume, 1st President of Zanzibar (died 1972)
- 1906 – Eugen Schuhmacher, German zoologist, director, and producer (died 1973)
- 1908 – Kurt Eichhorn, German conductor (died 1994)
- 1909 – Glenn Cunningham, American runner and academic (died 1988)
- 1909 – Saunders Mac Lane, American mathematician (co-founded category theory) (died 2005)
- 1910 – Anita Page, American actress (died 2008)
- 1910 – William Schuman, American composer and educator (died 1992)
- 1910 – Hedda Sterne, Romanian-American painter and photographer (died 2011)
- 1912 – Aleksandr Danilovich Aleksandrov, Russian mathematician, physicist, and mountaineer (died 1999)
- 1912 – David Raksin, American composer and educator (died 2004)
- 1912 – Raoul Wallenberg, Swedish architect and diplomat, savior of thousands of Jews from The Holocaust (died ~1947)
- 1913 – Wesley Addy, American actor (died 1996)
- 1913 – Robert Hayden, American poet and educator (died 1980)
- 1915 – Warren Avis, American businessman, founded Avis Rent a Car System (died 2007)
- 1917 – John Fitch, American race car driver and engineer (died 2012)
- 1918 – Brian Crozier, Australian-English historian and journalist (died 2012)
- 1919 – Michel Déon, French novelist, playwright, and critic (died 2016)
- 1919 – Sidney Harman, Canadian-American businessman and audio pioneer responsible for the first high-fidelity stereo receiver (died 2011)
- 1920 – Helen Thomas, American journalist and author (died 2013)
- 1921 – Herb Ellis, American guitarist (died 2010)
- 1921 – Maurice Richard, Canadian ice hockey player and coach (died 2000)
- 1922 – Mayme Agnew Clayton, American librarian (died 2006)
- 1922 – Luis Aponte Martínez, Puerto Rican cardinal (died 2012)
- 1926 – George Irving Bell, American physicist, biologist, and mountaineer (died 2000)
- 1926 – Perry Moss, American football player and coach (died 2014)
- 1928 – Gerard Damiano, American director, producer, and screenwriter (died 2008)
- 1928 – Nadežka Mosusova, Serbian composer
- 1928 – Clarke Reed, American businessman and politician (died 2024)
- 1929 – Kishore Kumar, Indian singer-songwriter and actor (died 1987)
- 1929 – Vellore G. Ramabhadran, Mridangam artiste from Tamil Nadu, India (died 2012)
- 1930 – Ali al-Sistani, Iranian-Iraqi cleric and scholar
- 1931 – Naren Tamhane, Indian cricketer (died 2002)
- 1932 – Frances E. Allen, American computer scientist and academic (died 2020)
- 1932 – Liang Congjie, Chinese environmentalist, founded Friends of Nature (died 2010)
- 1934 – Dallas Green, American baseball player and manager (died 2017)
- 1935 – Carol Arthur, American actress and producer (died 2020)
- 1935 – Hans-Walter Eigenbrodt, German footballer and coach (died 1997)
- 1935 – Michael J. Noonan, Irish farmer and politician, 25th Minister of Defence for Ireland (died 2013)
- 1936 – Giorgos Zographos, Greek singer and actor (died 2005)
- 1937 – David Bedford, English keyboard player, composer, and conductor (died 2011)
- 1938 – Ellen Schrecker, American historian and academic
- 1939 – Jack Cunningham, Baron Cunningham of Felling, English politician, Minister for the Cabinet Office
- 1939 – Frankie Ford, American R&B/rock and roll singer (died 2015)
- 1940 – Coriún Aharonián, Uruguayan composer and musicologist (died 2017)
- 1940 – Robin Harper, Scottish academic and politician
- 1940 – Larry Knechtel, American bass player and pianist (died 2009)
- 1940 – Frances Stewart, English economist and academic
- 1940 – Timi Yuro, American singer-songwriter (died 2004)
- 1941 – Martin Jarvis, English actor
- 1941 – Andy Smillie, English footballer
- 1941 – Cliff Nobles, American musician (died 2008)
- 1941 – Ted Strickland, American psychologist and politician, 68th Governor of Ohio
- 1941 – Régis Barroso, Brazilian politician (died 2026)
- 1942 – Don S. Davis, American actor (died 2008)
- 1942 – Cleon Jones, American baseball player
- 1942 – David Lange, New Zealand lawyer and politician, 32nd Prime Minister of New Zealand (died 2005)
- 1943 – Vicente Álvarez Areces, Spanish politician, 6th President of the Principality of Asturias (died 2019)
- 1943 – Barbara Saß-Viehweger, German politician, lawyer and civil law notary
- 1943 – Bjørn Wirkola, Norwegian ski jumper and footballer
- 1944 – Richard Belzer, American actor (died 2023)
- 1944 – Doudou Ndoye, Senegalese lawyer and politician
- 1945 – Paul McCarthy, American painter and sculptor
- 1945 – Alan Mulally, American engineer and businessman
- 1946 – Aleksei Turovski, Estonian zoologist and ethologist
- 1947 – Klaus Schulze, German keyboard player and songwriter (died 2022)
- 1948 – Johnny Grubb, American baseball player and coach
- 1949 – John Riggins, American football player, sportscaster, and actor
- 1950 – Caldwell Jones, American basketball player and coach (died 2014)
- 1950 – Natesan Rangaswamy, Indian lawyer and politician, 9th Chief Minister of Puducherry
- 1951 – Peter Goodfellow, English geneticist and academic
- 1952 – James Arbuthnot, English lawyer and politician, Secretary of State for Business, Innovation and Skills
- 1952 – Moya Brennan, Irish singer-songwriter and harp player (died 2026)
- 1952 – Gábor Demszky, Hungarian sociologist, lawyer, and politician
- 1953 – Hiroyuki Usui, Japanese footballer and manager
- 1954 – Anatoliy Kinakh, Ukrainian engineer and politician, 11th Prime Minister of Ukraine
- 1954 – Steve Phillips, English footballer
- 1954 – François Valéry, Algerian-French singer-songwriter
- 1955 – Alberto Gonzales, American soldier, lawyer, and politician, 80th United States Attorney General
- 1955 – Billy Bob Thornton, American actor, director, and screenwriter
- 1957 – Rupert Farley, British actor and voice actor
- 1957 – Brooks D. Simpson, American historian and author
- 1957 – Valdis Valters, Latvian basketball player and coach
- 1957 – John Wark, Scottish footballer and sportscaster
- 1958 – Allison Hedge Coke, American-Canadian poet and academic
- 1958 – Mary Decker, American runner
- 1958 – Silvan Shalom, Tunisian-Israeli sergeant and politician, 30th Deputy Prime Minister of Israel
- 1958 – Brian Voss, American tenpin bowler
- 1959 – Robbin Crosby, American guitarist and songwriter (died 2002)
- 1959 – John Gormley, Irish politician, Minister for the Environment, Community and Local Government
- 1960 – Chuck C. Lopez, American jockey
- 1960 – Dean Malenko, American wrestler
- 1960 – José Luis Rodríguez Zapatero, Spanish academic and politician, 5th Prime Minister of Spain
- 1960 – Bernard Rose, English director, screenwriter, and cinematographer
- 1960 – Tim Winton, Australian author and playwright
- 1961 – Barack Obama, American lawyer and politician, 44th President of the United States, Nobel Prize laureate
- 1962 – Roger Clemens, American baseball player and actor
- 1962 – Paul Reynolds, English singer-songwriter and guitarist
- 1963 – Keith Maurice Ellison, 30th Attorney General of Minnesota
- 1964 – Andrew Bartlett, Australian social worker and politician
- 1965 – Vishal Bhardwaj, Indian film director, screenwriter, producer, music composer and playback singer
- 1965 – Adam Afriyie, English businessman and politician
- 1965 – Terri Lyne Carrington, American award-winning jazz drummer, composer and educator
- 1965 – Dennis Lehane, American author, screenwriter, and producer
- 1965 – Fredrik Reinfeldt, Swedish soldier and politician, 42nd Prime Minister of Sweden
- 1965 – Michael Skibbe, German footballer and manager
- 1967 – Michael Marsh, American sprinter
- 1968 – Daniel Dae Kim, South Korean-American actor
- 1968 – Lee Mack, English comedian, actor, producer, and screenwriter
- 1969 – Max Cavalera, Brazilian singer-songwriter and guitarist
- 1970 – John August, American director and screenwriter
- 1970 – Bret Baier, American journalist
- 1970 – Kate Silverton, English journalist
- 1971 – Jeff Gordon, American race car driver and actor
- 1972 – Stefan Brogren, Canadian actor, director, producer, and screenwriter
- 1973 – Eva Amaral, Spanish singer-songwriter and guitarist
- 1973 – Xavier Marchand, French swimmer
- 1973 – Marek Penksa, Slovak footballer
- 1973 – Marcos Roberto Silveira Reis, Brazilian footballer
- 1974 – Kily González, Argentine footballer
- 1975 – Andy Hallett, American actor and singer (died 2009)
- 1975 – Nikos Liberopoulos, Greek footballer
- 1975 – Jutta Urpilainen, Finnish politician, Deputy Prime Minister of Finland
- 1975 – Daniella van Graas, Dutch model and actress
- 1976 – Paul Goldstein, American tennis player
- 1976 – Andrew McLeod, Australian footballer
- 1976 – Trevor Woodman, English rugby player and coach
- 1977 – Frankie Kazarian, American wrestler
- 1977 – Luís Boa Morte, Portuguese footballer and manager
- 1978 – Jeremy Adduono, Canadian ice hockey player and coach
- 1978 – Luke Allen, American baseball player (died 2022)
- 1978 – Kurt Busch, American race car driver
- 1978 – Agnė Eggerth, Lithuanian sprinter
- 1978 – Ricardo Serrano, Spanish cyclist
- 1978 – Per-Åge Skrøder, Norwegian ice hockey player
- 1978 – Satoshi Hino, Japanese voice actor
- 1979 – Robin Peterson, South African cricketer
- 1980 – Richard Dawson, English cricketer and coach
- 1981 – Marques Houston, American singer-songwriter, producer, and actor
- 1981 – Meghan, Duchess of Sussex, American member of British royal family, media personality and actress
- 1983 – Greta Gerwig, American actress, producer, and screenwriter
- 1984 – Terry Campese, Australian rugby league player
- 1984 – Mardy Collins, American basketball player
- 1985 – Crystal Bowersox, American singer-songwriter and guitarist
- 1985 – Robbie Findley, American soccer player
- 1985 – Mark Milligan, Australian footballer
- 1985 – Ha Seung-jin, South Korean basketball player
- 1985 – Antonio Valencia, Ecuadorean footballer
- 1986 – Nick Augusto, American drummer
- 1986 – Leon Camier, English motorcycle racer
- 1986 – Cicinho, Brazilian footballer
- 1986 – Iosia Soliola, New Zealand-Samoan rugby league player
- 1986 – David Williams, Australian rugby league player
- 1987 – Marreese Speights American basketball player
- 1988 – Kelley O'Hara, American soccer player
- 1989 – Jessica Mauboy, Australian singer-songwriter and actress
- 1989 – Wang Hao, Chinese chess grandmaster
- 1992 – Daniele Garozzo, Italian fencer
- 1992 – Domingo Germán, Dominican baseball player
- 1992 – Cole Sprouse, American actor
- 1992 – Dylan Sprouse, American actor
- 1994 – Bobby Shmurda, American rapper
- 1995 – Bruna Marquezine, Brazilian actress
- 1998 – Lil Skies, American rapper

== Deaths ==
=== Pre-1600 ===
- 221 – Lady Zhen, Chinese empress (born 183)
- 966 – Berengar II of Italy (born 900)
- 1060 – Henry I of France (born 1008)
- 1113 – Gertrude of Saxony, countess and regent of Holland (born c. 1030)
- 1265 - Casualties of the Battle of Evesham
  - Peter de Montfort, English politician (born 1215)
  - Henry de Montfort (born 1238)
  - Simon de Montfort, 6th Earl of Leicester, French-English soldier and politician, Lord High Steward (born 1208)
  - Hugh le Despencer, 1st Baron le Despencer, English politician (born 1223)
- 1266 – Eudes of Burgundy, Count of Nevers (born 1230)
- 1306 – Wenceslaus III of Bohemia (born 1289)
- 1345 – As-Salih Ismail, Sultan of Egypt (born 1326)
- 1378 – Galeazzo II Visconti, Lord of Milan (born c. 1320)
- 1430 – Philip I, Duke of Brabant (born 1404)
- 1526 – Juan Sebastián Elcano, Spanish explorer and navigator (born 1476)
- 1578 – Sebastian of Portugal (born 1554)
- 1598 – William Cecil, 1st Baron Burghley, English academic and politician, Lord High Treasurer (born 1520)

=== 1601–1900 ===
- 1612 – Hugh Broughton, English scholar and theologian (born 1549)
- 1639 – Juan Ruiz de Alarcón, Mexican actor and playwright (born 1581)
- 1718 – René Lepage de Sainte-Claire, French-Canadian founder of Rimouski (born 1656)
- 1727 – Victor-Maurice, comte de Broglie, French general (born 1647)
- 1741 – Andrew Hamilton, Scottish-American lawyer and politician (born 1676)
- 1778 – Pierre de Rigaud, Marquis de Vaudreuil-Cavagnial, Canadian-French politician, Governor General of New France (born 1698)
- 1792 – John Burgoyne, English general and politician (born 1723)
- 1795 – Timothy Ruggles, American lawyer, jurist, and politician (born 1711)
- 1804 – Adam Duncan, 1st Viscount Duncan, Scottish admiral (born 1731)
- 1822 – Kristjan Jaak Peterson, Estonian poet and author (born 1801)
- 1844 – Jacob Aall, Norwegian economist, historian, and politician (born 1773)
- 1859 – John Vianney, French priest and saint (born 1786)
- 1873 – Viktor Hartmann, Russian architect and painter (born 1834)
- 1875 – Hans Christian Andersen, Danish novelist, short story writer, and poet (born 1805)
- 1886 – Samuel J. Tilden, American lawyer and politician, 25th Governor of New York (born 1814)
- 1900 – Isaac Levitan, Russian painter and educator (born 1860)

=== 1901–present ===
- 1914 – Jules Lemaître, French playwright and critic (born 1853)
- 1919 – Dave Gregory, Australian cricketer and umpire (born 1845)
- 1922 – Enver Pasha, Ottoman general and politician (born 1881)
- 1932 – Alfred Henry Maurer, American painter (born 1868)
- 1938 – Pearl White, American actress (born 1889)
- 1940 – Ze'ev Jabotinsky, Ukrainian-American general, journalist, and activist (born 1880)
- 1941 – Mihály Babits, Hungarian poet and author (born 1883)
- 1942 – Alberto Franchetti, Italian composer and educator (born 1860)
- 1944 – Krzysztof Kamil Baczyński, Polish soldier and poet (born 1921)
- 1957 – John Cain Sr., Australian politician, 34th Premier of Victoria (born 1882)
- 1957 – Washington Luís, Brazilian lawyer and politician, 13th President of Brazil (born 1869)
- 1958 – Ethel Anderson, Australian poet, author, and painter (born 1883)
- 1959 – József Révai, Hungarian politician, Hungarian Minister of Education (born 1898)
- 1961 – Margarito Bautista, Nahua-Mexican evangelizer, theologian, and religious founder (born 1878)
- 1962 – Marilyn Monroe, American model and actress (born 1926)
- 1964 – Nätti-Jussi, Finnish lumberjack and forest laborer (born 1890)
- 1967 – Peter Smith, English cricketer (born 1908)
- 1976 – Enrique Angelelli, Argentinian bishop and martyr (born 1923)
- 1976 – Roy Thomson, 1st Baron Thomson of Fleet, Canadian-English publisher (born 1894)
- 1977 – Edgar Adrian, 1st Baron Adrian, English physiologist and academic, Nobel Prize laureate (born 1889)
- 1981 – Melvyn Douglas, American actor (born 1901)
- 1982 – Bruce Goff, American architect, designed the Boston Avenue Methodist Church (born 1904)
- 1985 – Don Whillans, English rock climber and mountaineer (born 1933)
- 1990 – Ettore Maserati, Italian engineer and businessman (born 1894)
- 1992 – Seichō Matsumoto, Japanese author (born 1909)
- 1996 – Geoff Hamilton, English gardener, author, and television host (born 1936)
- 1997 – Jeanne Calment, French super-centenarian; holds records for the world's substantiated longest-lived person (born 1875)
- 1998 – Yury Artyukhin, Russian colonel, engineer, and astronaut (born 1930)
- 1999 – Victor Mature, American actor (born 1913)
- 2003 – Frederick Chapman Robbins, American pediatrician and virologist, Nobel Prize laureate (born 1916)
- 2004 – Mary Sherman Morgan, American chemist and engineer (born 1921)
- 2004 – Hossein Panahi (Persian: حسین پناهی), Iranian actor and poet (born 1956)
- 2005 – Anatoly Larkin, Russian-American physicist and theorist (born 1932)
- 2005 – Iván Szabó, Hungarian economist and politician, Minister of Finance of Hungary (born 1934)
- 2007 – Lee Hazlewood, American singer-songwriter and producer (born 1929)
- 2007 – Raul Hilberg, Austrian-American political scientist and historian (born 1926)
- 2008 – Craig Jones, English motorcycle racer (born 1985)
- 2009 – Blake Snyder, American screenwriter and producer (born 1957)
- 2011 – Naoki Matsuda, Japanese footballer (born 1977)
- 2012 – Johnnie Bassett, American singer-songwriter and guitarist (born 1935)
- 2012 – Brian Crozier, Australian-English journalist and historian (born 1918)
- 2012 – Bud Riley, American football player and coach (born 1925)
- 2013 – Keith H. Basso, American anthropologist and academic (born 1940)
- 2013 – Art Donovan, American football player and radio host (born 1925)
- 2013 – Olavi J. Mattila, Finnish engineer and politician, Finnish Minister of Foreign Affairs (born 1918)
- 2013 – Renato Ruggiero, Italian lawyer and politician, Italian Minister of Foreign Affairs (born 1930)
- 2013 – Tony Snell, English lieutenant and pilot (born 1922)
- 2013 – Sandy Woodward, English admiral (born 1932)
- 2014 – James Brady, American activist and politician, 15th White House Press Secretary (born 1940)
- 2014 – Chester Crandell, American lawyer and politician (born 1946)
- 2014 – Jake Hooker, Israeli-American guitarist and songwriter (born 1953)
- 2015 – Elsie Hillman, American philanthropist and politician (born 1925)
- 2015 – Les Munro, New Zealand soldier and pilot (born 1919)
- 2015 – John Rudometkin, American basketball player (born 1940)
- 2015 – Billy Sherrill, American songwriter and producer (born 1936)
- 2019 – Nuon Chea, Cambodian politician and theorist for the Khmer Rouge (born 1926)
- 2023 – Dalia Fadila, Israeli educator (born 1971/1972)
- 2024 – Charles Cyphers, American actor (born 1939)
- 2024 – Tsung-Dao Lee, Chinese-American physicist and academic, Nobel Prize laureate (born 1926)
- 2024 – Duane Thomas, American football player (born 1947)

== Holidays and observances ==
- Christian feast day:
  - Aristarchus
  - Blessed Cecilia Cesarini
  - Euphronius
  - Blessed Frédéric Janssoone
  - John Vianney
  - Molua (or Lua)
  - Raynerius of Split
  - Sithney, patron saint of mad dogs
  - August 4 (Eastern Orthodox liturgics)
- Coast Guard Day (United States)
- Constitution Day (Cook Islands); first Monday in August
- Matica slovenská Day (Slovakia)
- Barack Obama Day in Illinois in the United States
- 2020 Beirut explosion commemoration day in Lebanon
