= Airport seating =

Public seating area at an airport

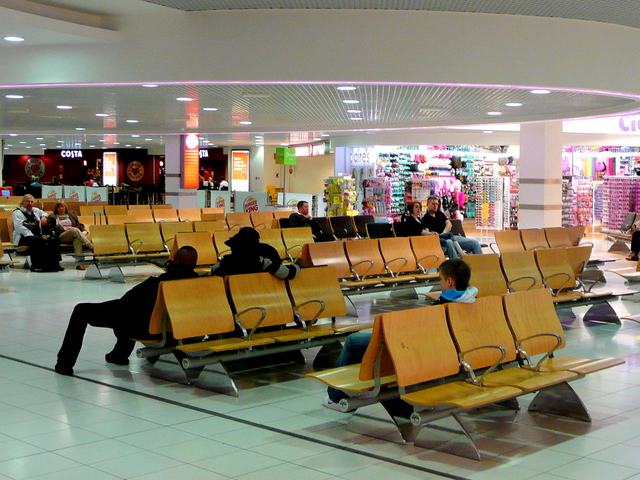
A Zoeftig installation with the Zenky model at Birmingham Airport

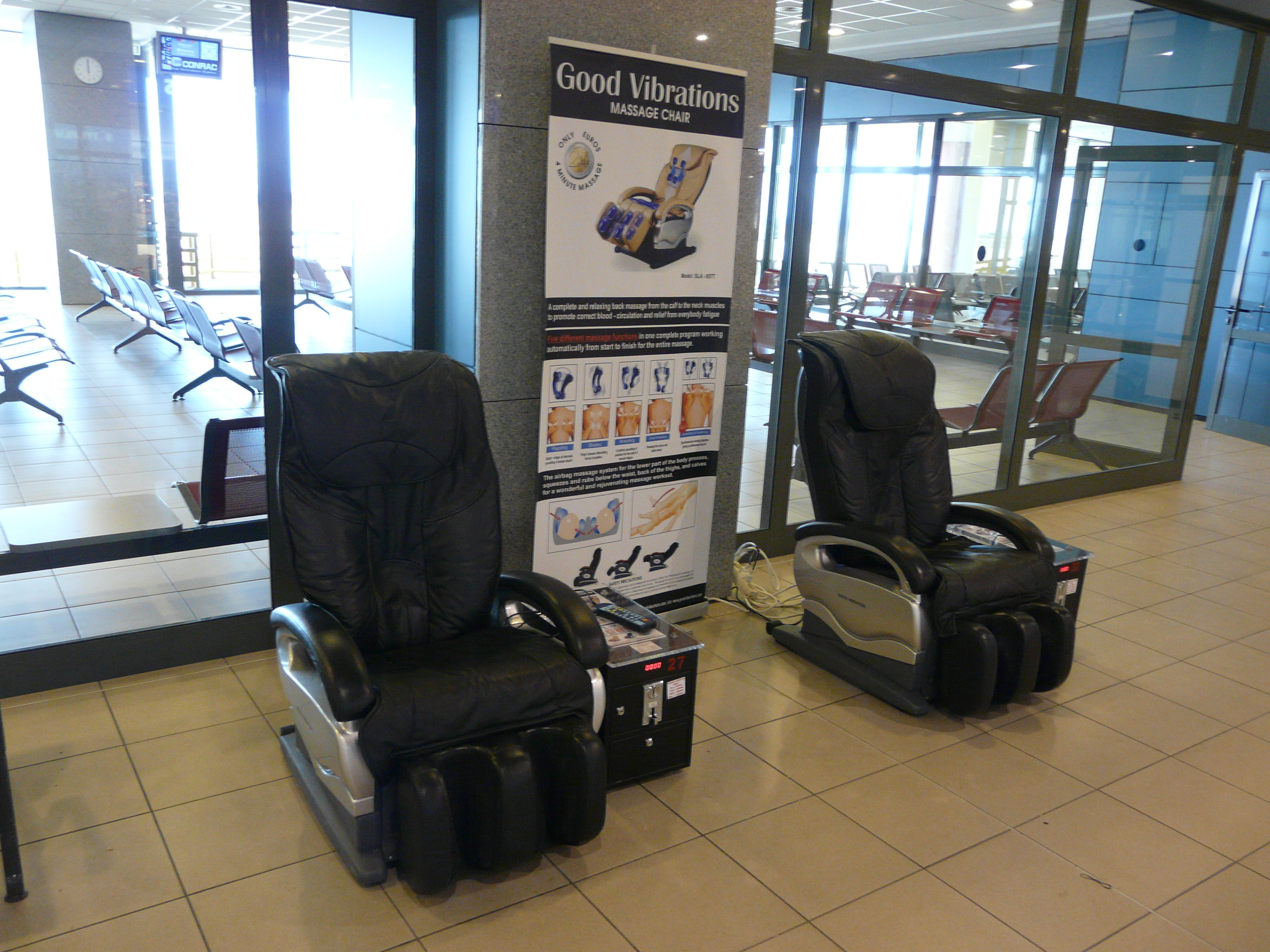
A variety of chairs for massage and waiting at a gate

An airport chair or airport seating is a public seating area at an airport, commonly placed near restaurants and airline lounges.

== Design ==
Robert Sommer studied the design of airport seating and concluded that the arrangement of chairs in rigid lines bolted to the floor was deliberately Sociofugal — discouraging any form of social interaction between individuals and encouraging them to go to commercial locations such as shops and cafes. The provision of arms on the chairs increased the usage of the chairs as compared with bench seats without armrests. Strangers are more comfortable sitting adjacent to each other, if there is an armrest, to mark their personal space. The parallel orientation of the modular seat units also minimizes face-to-face contact, making it seem less threatening for strangers.

== History ==
While designing chairs of the Chicago O’Hare International Airport in 1962, Charles and Ray Eames sought to design a chair that would not only be stylish, but also functional for the people occupying each seat. This seat became known as the “Eames Tandem Sling Seat”. Brian Alexander later updated the Eames seat by adding an occasional table in between seats and power outlets for convenient charging of mobile devices.

Airport terminals designed by major architects such as Renzo Piano (Kansai International Airport) or Richard Rogers (Heathrow Terminal 5) require high-quality seating to match the general quality of their interiors.

== Variance in airport lounges ==
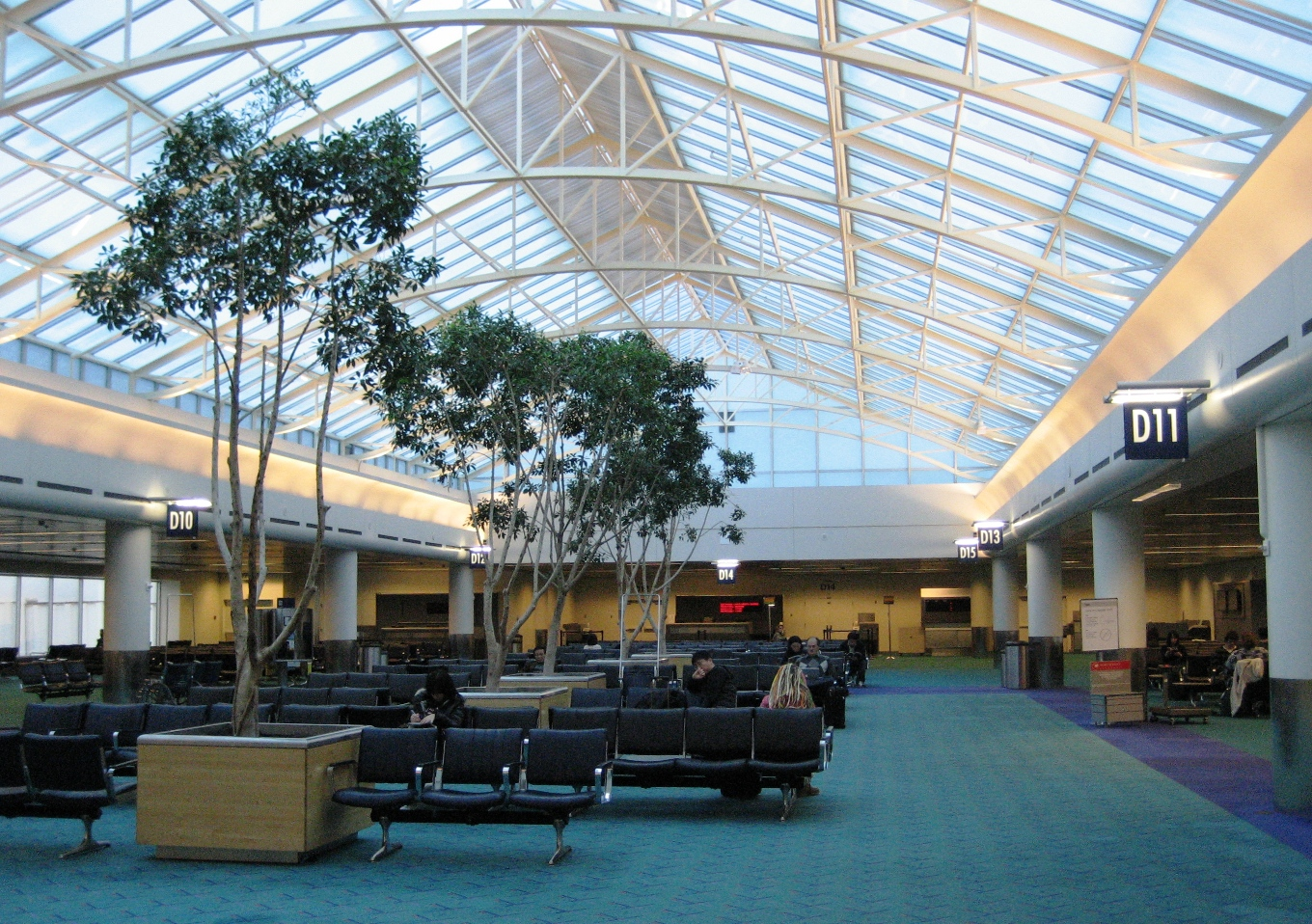
Traditional airport seating at Portland International Airport (PDX) in Portland, Oregon, USA gate

Seating in airports plays a significant role in the satisfaction of traveling passengers and their overall experience in airports. Seating is essential to airports because it improves passenger experience and visual appeal.

=== Purpose of seating styles ===
The design of the standard airport seating has not seen a significant change in over 50 years and is known for its simplicity. The primary focus of today’s airport seating is the size and comfort of seating to fit the environment that the airport and airline desire to create.

Since fire safety is a significant consideration at airports, regulations now govern the contents of airport terminals, affecting the materials used for seating.

Airport lounges provide greater comfort and services to travelers with a membership in a location separate from the standard airport environment. While standard domestic and international airport lounges include basic seating and access to charging stations, these membership-based lounges provide more comfortable and spacious seating.

=== Types of seating ===
Dubai International Airport (DXB) provides airline travelers with a premium range of seating materials in various colors, such as blue, red, black and grey. DXB is an example of an airport that is focused on setting apart standards of original airport seating and experimenting with various colors to enhance appearance and comfort.

Priority Pass is a membership-based lounge access service that caters to airports around the world, including those in Africa, Asia, Continental Europe, Latin America and The Caribbean, the Middle East, North America, and the UK. With 25 years of service, Priority Pass has been providing passengers with elegant seating styles.

The first sleeping pod was introduced in 2013 at Helsinki Airport in Finland. The sleeping pod allowed airline travelers to relax in their own peaceful space. The pod features adjustment to be turned from a seat to a bed, a storage area for carry-on luggage, and charging connectivity.

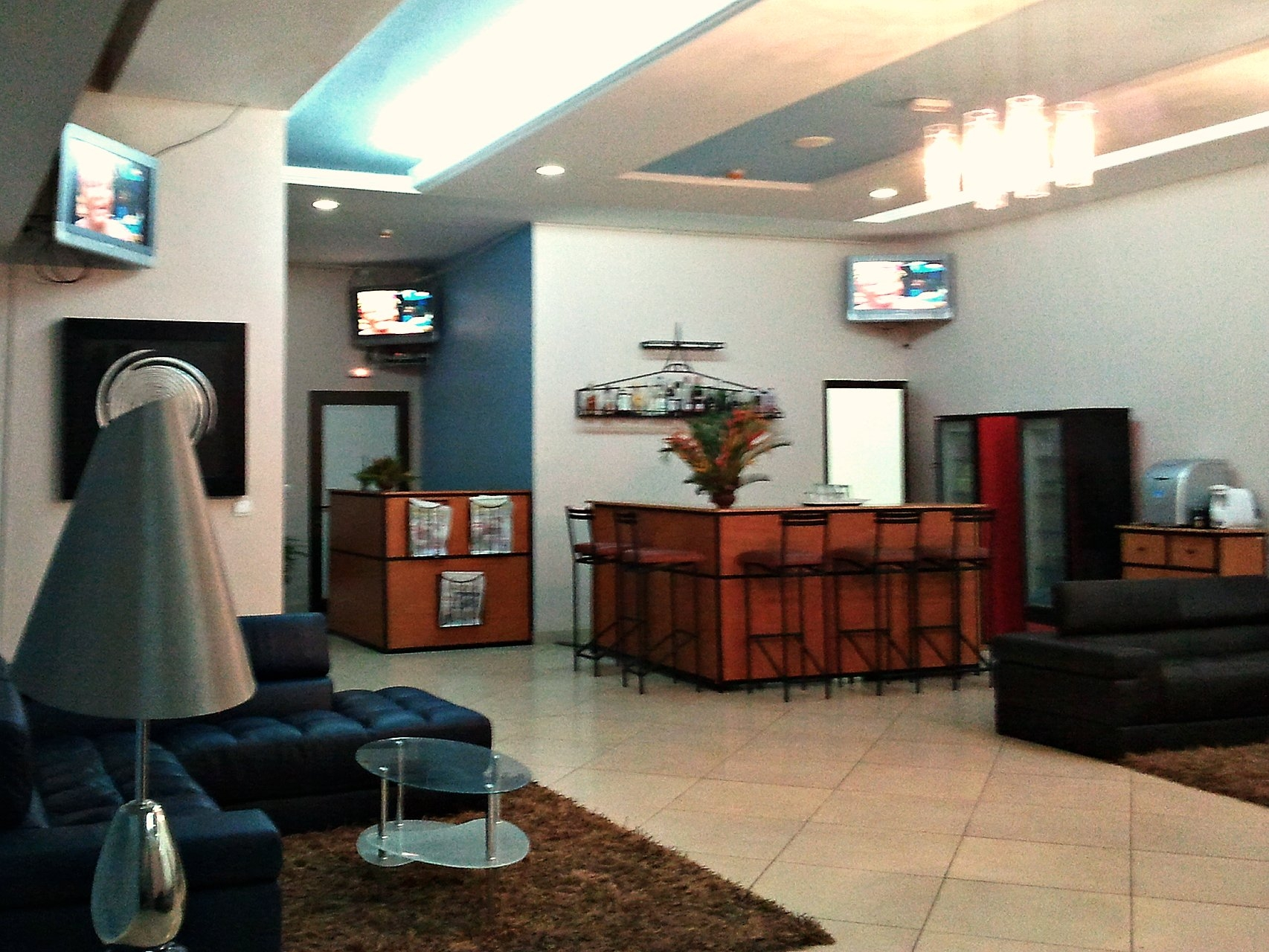
Business class lounge at Bamako-Sénou International Airport offers relaxed seating including bar-style seating.

== Comfort trends ==
The environment of airport waiting areas is continuously updated, and revamped to enhance the experience of the traveler. Due to the reinforcement of airport security, the wait time for passengers has significantly increased. To accommodate customer experience, airports have made an effort to increase seating in lobbies and seating areas. The space surrounding the seating area within an airport is designed to encourage comfort, happiness, and connectedness among travelers.

The level of comfort travelers experience is dependent on a variety of factors.

The six airport services factors are:

- Design
- Scent
- Functional organization
- Air/lighting conditions
- Seating
- Cleanliness

In a study regarding the importance of these factors, it was found that there is a positive correlation between the comfort of the traveler and the scent of the waiting area. A higher level of comfort has encouraged the desire to fly through a specific airline more than once.

=== Modern technologies ===
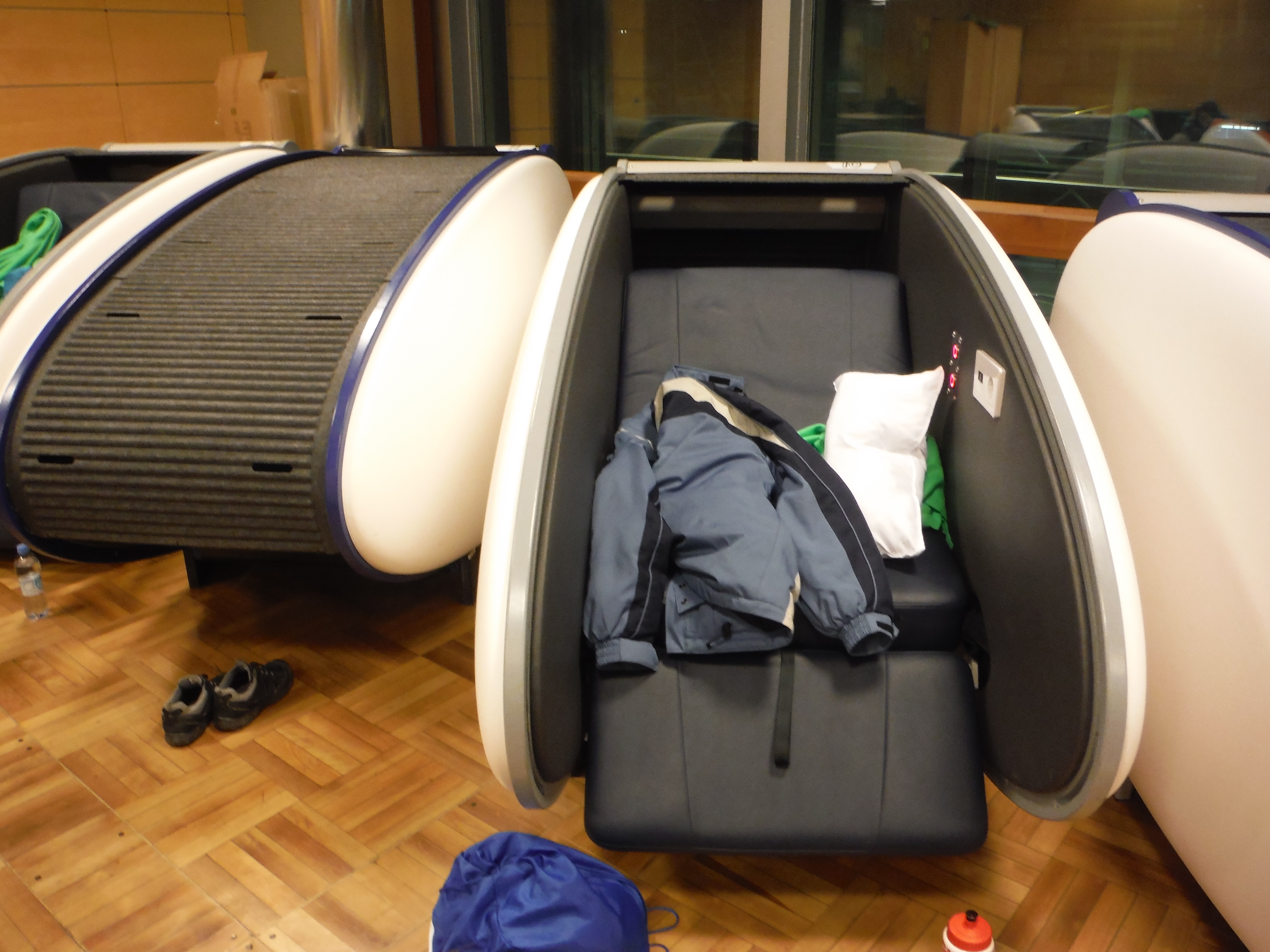
GoSleep sleeping pods in Abu Dhabi International Airport provide privacy and comfort for sleeping in a public area.

New styles of seating were developed to accommodate new technologies. The Ampere modular tandem seating system is designed to allow travelers to use multiple electrical devices while remaining seated in their chairs.

Since business travelers commonly wish to use laptop computers while waiting, seating for them may incorporate a charging point and some form of desk.

GoSleep sleeping pods at the Abu Dhabi International Airport allow travelers to sleep during long layovers. The pods include a cover for security and privacy, and power outlets for charging electronic devices.
