= Flight zone =

Range at which an animal flees from a threat

Flight initiation distance (FID) buffer from critical wildlife area.

The flight zone of an animal is the perimeter area surrounding it that, if encroached upon by a potential predator or threat (including approaching humans), will cause alarm and escape behavior. The flight zone is determined by the animal's flight distance, sometimes also called flight initiation distance (FID) which extends horizontally from the animal and sometimes vertically. It may also be termed escape distance, alert distance, flush distance, and escape flight distance.

Swiss zoologist Heini Hediger distinguished between flight distance (escape boundary), critical distance (attack boundary), personal distance (distance separating members of non-contact species, as a pair of swans), and social distance (intraspecies communication distance).

Flight distance can be used as a measure of the willingness of an animal to take risks. Escape theory predicts that the probability of fleeing and flight distance increase as perceived predation risk increases and decreases as escape cost increases. Flight initiation distance is one measure of animals' fear responses to humans. Urban wildlifes, domesticated and captive animals, which are more accustomed to the presence of humans, have significantly shorter flight distances than wild animals.

In a study comparing 56 bird species with long flight distances, it was found these had declining populations in Europe. This indicates that standardized measures of flight distance can provide reliable information about the population consequences of risk-taking behaviour by individuals and the susceptibility of different species to increased levels of disturbance by humans. A further study analyzing 75 flight initiation distance studies of 212 species found that larger species are more tolerant of humans.

When the flight zone of a group of bulls was invaded by a mechanical trolley, the bulls moved away and maintained a constant distance between themselves and the trolley. This indicates animals sometimes maintain a flight zone around unfamiliar inanimate objects.

The flight initiation distance is being used as a tool in wildlife management. By studying flight zones, wildlife managers are able to reduce the impact of humans by creating ecological buffer zones between human settlements and animal habitats.

The alert distance (AD) is the distance, by definition greater, within which the animal changes its behaviour in a manner enabling it to better observe the stimulus, as by raising the head in an alert posture, but does not necessarily flee unless the stimulus is also within the escape distance. These measures are usually used to quantify the tolerance of wildlife to humans.

== Factors influencing size ==
Animals faced with approaching predators must decide at which distance to initiate their flight, and they are expected to do so in a way that maximizes their fitness. As flight has both costs (including lost opportunity) and benefits, there will be in general an optimal flight initiation distance, defined as the first point in a predator's approach at which the benefit of flight exceeds the cost. The benefit of flight is equivalent to the cost of remaining in place or, in other words, to the risk of capture. The size of the flight zone can therefore vary according to circumstances. However, it has been shown in burrowing owls that individuals showed high repeatability in their FID.

- Behaviour of the threat: In horned lizards, FID decreased as the distance between a turning predator and prey increased, but was greater when the predator turned toward than away from the fleeing animal. The FID and alert response of American robins to approaching humans was investigated; the greatest FID was when the approaching person was not on paths and was looking at the birds, while the lowest FID occurred when the person was on a path and not looking at the robins. The authors suggested this indicated that they use gaze direction to assess risk.
- Social: In lizards, FID was shorter during social encounters than when they were solitary. and FID was shorter in female lizards when they were interacting with males than when they were alone; it was also shorter in males interacting with either sex.
- Distance to refuge: Gray squirrels (Sciurus carolinensis) typically run to the nearest tree to escape from predators. As the risk of capture increases with distance from the refuge tree, squirrels feeding far from trees should have greater FID than those feeding closer by. Confirming this, FID in response to a motorized model predator (a cat) increased as distance to refuge increased. Burrowing Owls breeding in territories far from roads showed larger FIDs than individuals breeding closer to roads and mated owls showed similar FIDs. Individual owls showed high repeatability in their FID.
- Training and learning: The size of the flight zone can depend upon the tameness or level of habituation of the animal. Completely tame animals have no flight zone for humans; that is, they will allow a person to approach and touch them. Wild, feral, and unbroken animals can have very large flight zones.

== Wildlife management ==
Wildlife managers often use ED and FID to develop set-back distances to reduce human impacts on wildlife, both in wildlife refuges, and, e.g., in planning areas for outdoor recreation.

These measures are also important in birding and nature photography.

The FID in multiple species differs from rural to urban areas. A study by Møller et al. examined 811 FIDs from 37 species of birds and determined that the FID of birds in urban areas is reduced, compared to the FID of birds in rural areas. Urbanization of birds has also been shown to correlate with changes in stress physiology and anti predator behaviour. Similarly, a circumtropical study that studied escape responses of 10,249 bird individuals from 842 bird species inhabiting open tropical ecosystems in Africa, South America, and Australia found that FIDs are smaller in urban than rural habitats and decline also with increasing human footprint. This may be due to a number of factors differing in rural vs urban areas, such as; difference in predator communities, length of exposure time to humans, relative abundance of humans, and the presence/abundance of food (bird-feeders in winter for example). Wildlife managers must adjust buffer zones depending on urban/rural environments. However, a situation may differ between taxa – a study on dragonflies and damselflies (Odonata) found that while urbanization level did not directly affect their escape behavior, escape responses of Odonata were delayed in areas with high human activity.

Some physical characteristics are very important to determine an animal's FID. Eye size and brain size have a role in determining the FID. FID in 107 species of birds was studied in relation to eye size and brain size and was shown that FID increases with larger eyes and decreases with larger brains. Larger eyes mean that predators can be detected from further away and thus the FID would be larger compared to smaller eyes. Larger brains decrease the FID compared to smaller brains, since they can better process the intent of predators and can delay their flight response for as long as possible.

FID can be highly variable, but it can also be viewed as a species-specific trait. A study conducted using eight species of shorebirds at six different sites in Australia was conducted to determine if FID was species specific. It was demonstrated that while both the species and the site influenced the FID, there was no significant interaction between them. This indicates that FID is species-specific, and while sites do influence the FID of a species, the average FID is a good reference for wildlife managers to use when creating buffer zones.

While escape distance has been generally used as a measure of tolerance, other changes in animal behavior in presence of humans, such as increased vigilance time at the cost of decreased feeding time, may have significant overall impact on wildlife. Therefore, it is suggested that a more conservative measure, namely, the alert distance, should be used in determining minimum approaching distance. The latter typically adds a certain buffer distance to the given tolerance measure.

== Animal handling ==
The flight zone is an important principle for herding, working, and mustering livestock. An animal can be stimulated to move simply by skirting its flight zone, and the animal will move in the desired direction according to the point of balance. The point of balance is usually located at the animal's shoulder according to their wide angled vision. An overstimulated animal will have a larger flight zone, for example an excited or scared animal. A Cumulative Flight Zone is formed when animals move in a herd. In this situation the lead animal's and the following animals' Points of Balance, within the cumulative flight zone, must both be crossed to entice movement.

The flight distance during handling is usually 1.5 to 7.6 m (5 to 25 ft) for beef cattle raised in a feeding operation and up to 30 m (98 ft) on mountain ranges. Brahman cattle have a larger flight zone than most English breeds. The flight zone can be thought of as the animal's personal space. The size of the flight zone is determined by the tameness of the animal; the more domesticated an animal, the smaller the zone. Fully tame animals have no flight zone.

The flight zones in cattle vary depending on the situation they are experiencing. Novel situations increase their flight zone, while accustomed stimuli will decrease their flight zone. The flight zone is larger in the front than behind, due to the majority of their senses pointing forward. As the animal becomes more relaxed in a situation or with a person its flight zone will reduce. The cow's prior experiences with humans has also been shown to affect their flight zone. Cows with positive handling experiences were shown to have smaller flight zones than those with negative handling experiences.

Studies with sheep indicated that animals confined in a narrow alley had a smaller flight zone compared to animals confined in a wider alley.

Handlers sometimes make the mistake of deeply invading the flight zone when animals are being driven down an alley or into an enclosed area such as a crowd pen. If the handler deeply penetrates the flight zone, the animals may turn back and run over them in an attempt to escape. Confining a livestock animal in a crush (chute) or alley can make it feel more secure and thus reduce the size of the flight zone; however, it does not eliminate the flight zone. An animal in a livestock raceway or alley that feels threatened may panic and injure itself or other animals. If handlers lean over fences around animals they penetrate the "zone of safety" and may cause the animals to rear.

=== Husbandry ===
Animals have a tendency to move in the opposite direction when their handler walks deep into their flight zone. By crossing an animal's point of balance, within the flight zone, a handler can move the herd in a particular direction and control their speed of movement. For example, crossing the point of balance from front to back will move the animal forwards, while the opposite is also true. The handler's pace should always reflect the animal's speed when herding. Additionally, pressure should be alternated on the flight zone to reduce stress. Constant pressure should never be applied.

If animals turn to face the handler he or she is considered to be no longer penetrating the flight zone.

It is important that a handler does not pursue any struggling animals as this will cause undue stress. Instead the animal should be allowed to return to the group as animals naturally have herd instincts, and will follow the group's leader. A good herding practice applying this is the movement of animals through a race by maintaining a steady flow of animals, not herding in groups, this allows new animals to follow the leader calmly. When yarded, animals should always have room to turn away from the handler to reduce stress. Minimal stress prevents injury to the animal and maintains good production, such as increased quality of meat and improved muscle and fat scores.

Appropriate frequent penetration of the flight zone can train the animals to minimise their flight zone to the handler.

Poor husbandry skills including over penetration of the flight zone results in the following behaviours: stress, panic, aggression, bolting, prey behaviour, charging, fainting, sickness and self-inflicted damage. Rough handling, such as constant flight zone pressure, can raise the heart rate of an animal. These factors are all reflective of the General Adaptation Syndrome.

=== General adaptation syndrome ===
The general adaptation syndrome (GAS) is a three-phase response to stress in animals.

- The first phase is the fight or flight response – the animal flight zone is included in this. Over penetration of the animal flight zone causes stimulation of the sympathetic nervous system (SNS). The SNS produces localised adjustments and responses; this includes the excretion of large quantities of epinephrine from the medulla of the adrenal gland. Epinephrine is commonly known as adrenaline. Adrenaline increases the supply of oxygen to vital organs and decreases supply to others. Frequent subjection to fight or flight situations causes severe endocrine disorders.
- The second phase is Adaptation and Resistance. It is the idea that recurring subjection builds natural immunity, and common handler movement and herding minimises an animal's flight zone.
- The third phase is Exhaustion. Strong, constant and over frequent stimulation of an animal's flight zone may lead to death, decreases production and lower quality of life. According to the GAS, a full recovery from exhaustion is possible over time.

== Sample values ==
Sample escape distances (mostly mean) from humans:

Birds of Europe

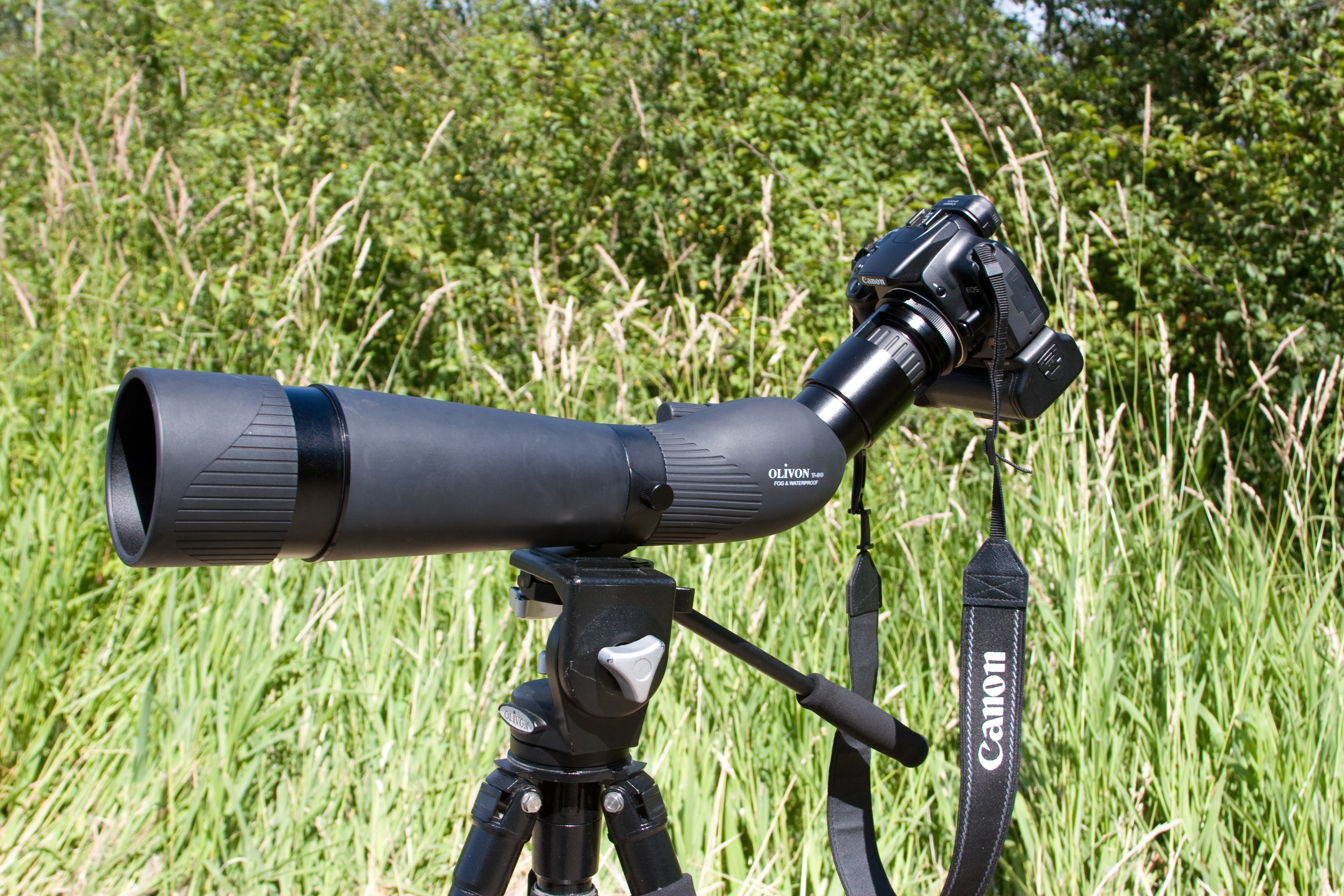
Because many birds flee from humans, ornithologists and birdwatchers sometimes use digiscoping equipment, allowing them to take pictures from long distances.

Species	ED [m]	ED [ft]	Ref.
Brent goose	(130–1,000) 319	(430–3,280) 1,050	
Northern pintail	(100–500) 294	(330–1,640) 960	
Grey heron	255	840	
Mallard	(60–400) 236	(200–1,310) 770	
Northern lapwing	162	530	
Dunlin	(15–450) 70	(50–1,480) 230	
Eurasian coot	68	220	
Whinchat	20–30	70–100	
Eurasian blackbird	10	30	
Blue tit	10	30	

Birds of North America

Species	FID [m]	FID [ft]
Golden eagle	105–390	340–1,280
Rough-legged hawk	53–884	170–2,900
Bald eagle	50–884	160–2,900
American golden plover	201	660
Great blue heron	201	660
Merlin	18–183	60–600
Prairie falcon	18–183	60–600
Great egret	101	330
Western meadowlark	30	100
American robin	9	30

Mammals of North America

Species	FID [m]	FID [ft]
Pronghorn Antilocapra americana	235	770
Mule deer Odocoileus hemionus	149–250	490–820
Elk Cervus canadensis	85–201	280–660
Bison Bison bison	101	330

== Factors affecting escape distances for birds ==
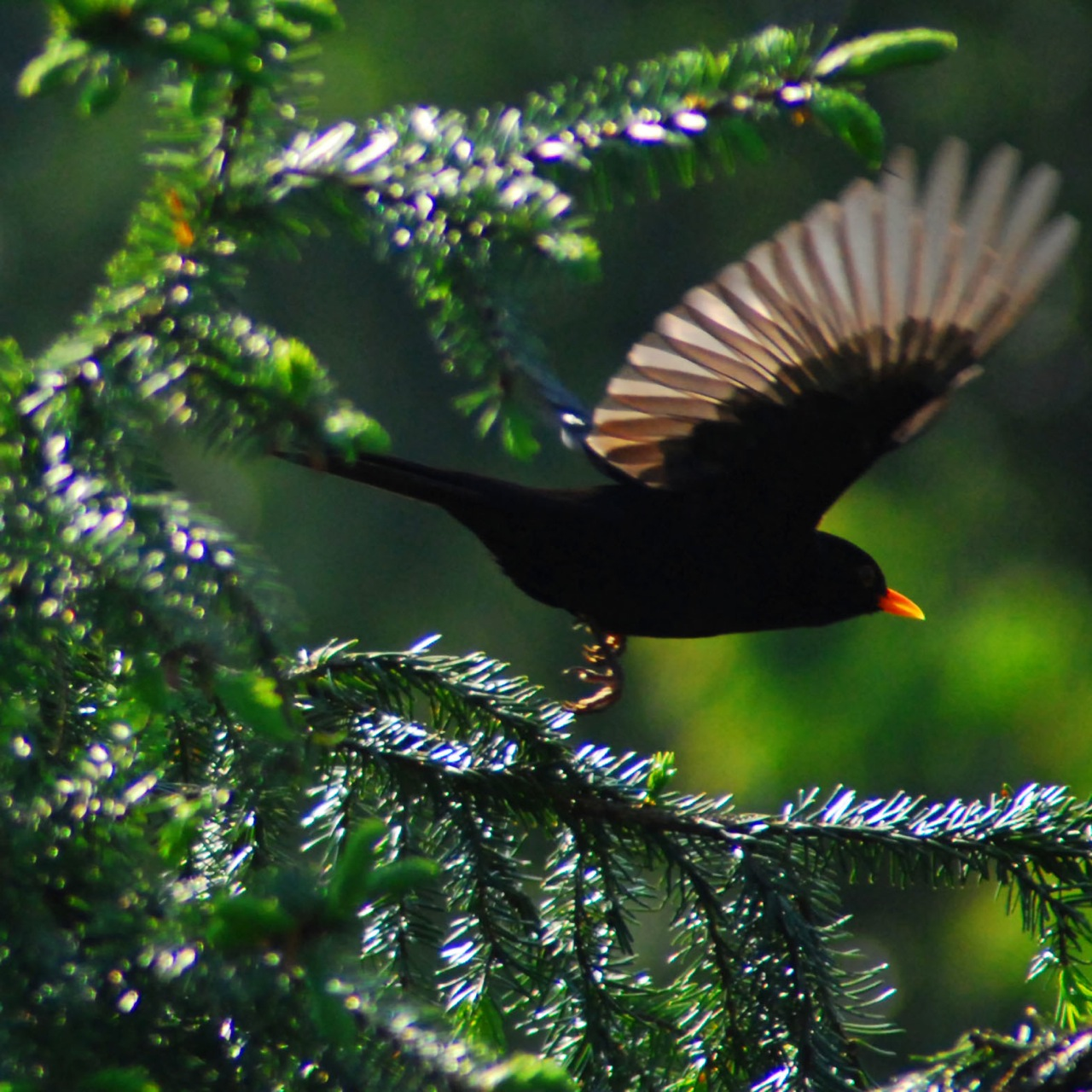
Fleeing blackbird

Escape distance may differ significantly depending on many circumstances. Body size is the best known general factor influencing interspecies differences. Very frequently large species are more timid than small species, because size affects how rapidly a bird can take off. Surprisingly, an analysis of hundreds of studies found that larger birds are more tolerant of humans, despite substantial research that shows larger animals are less tolerant of humans.

Among the affecting factors:

- Species – for example mallard Anas platyrhynchos has shorter ED than pintail Anas acuta.
- Age – young birds are less shy, for example dunlin Calidris alpina)
- Habituation to walking people. Mallards Anas platyrhynchos or Canada Geese Branta canadensis are less shy in a park than somewhere in the wild. Tits and Nuthatches near the feeder or in the park are less shy than in the wild.
- Season. For example, wintering bullfinches Pyrrhula pyrrhula have shorter EDs than breeding ones.
- Origin of birds – sometimes wintering birds from the north, perhaps not knowing people, are less shy than native, for example nutcracker Nucifraga caryocatactes
- Given bird individual
- Color of clothes of an observer and observer's behaviour
- Hunting status – quarry species have longer EDs than non-quarry, increasing during hunting season or after days with hunting.
- Flock size
- Flock composition – for example birds in mixed flocks of mallard Anas platyrhynchos and teal Anas crecca react at longer distances than those in single species flocks for either species. Or dunlin Calidris alpina in flocks with other waders.
- Visibility of the stimulus to the birds
- Wind force
- Vegetation height

== See also ==
- Birdwatching
- Digiscoping
- Fight-or-flight response
- Herding
- Nature photography
- Personal space
- Wildlife management
- Wildlife photography
