= Powermat Technologies =

Powermat Technologies Ltd. is a developer of wireless power techniques. The company licenses intellectual property (IP), selling charging spots to public venues along with the software to support their maintenance, management, and consumer interaction. The company's inductive charging technology has been adopted by the Power Matters Alliance (PMA) and is the platform adopted by Duracell, General Motors, Starbucks and AT&T.

== Products ==
Powermat manufactures both receivers and transmitters for the mobile industry, consumers, and public venues. It licenses its technology, which enables compliance with the AirFuel (formally PMA) and the Qi standard. Furthermore, Powermat operates a software service system to allow venue owners to control and manage their installed wireless power networks, each of which consists of charging spots and a gateway.

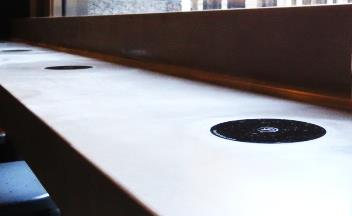
Charging spots in a work surface

== Technology ==
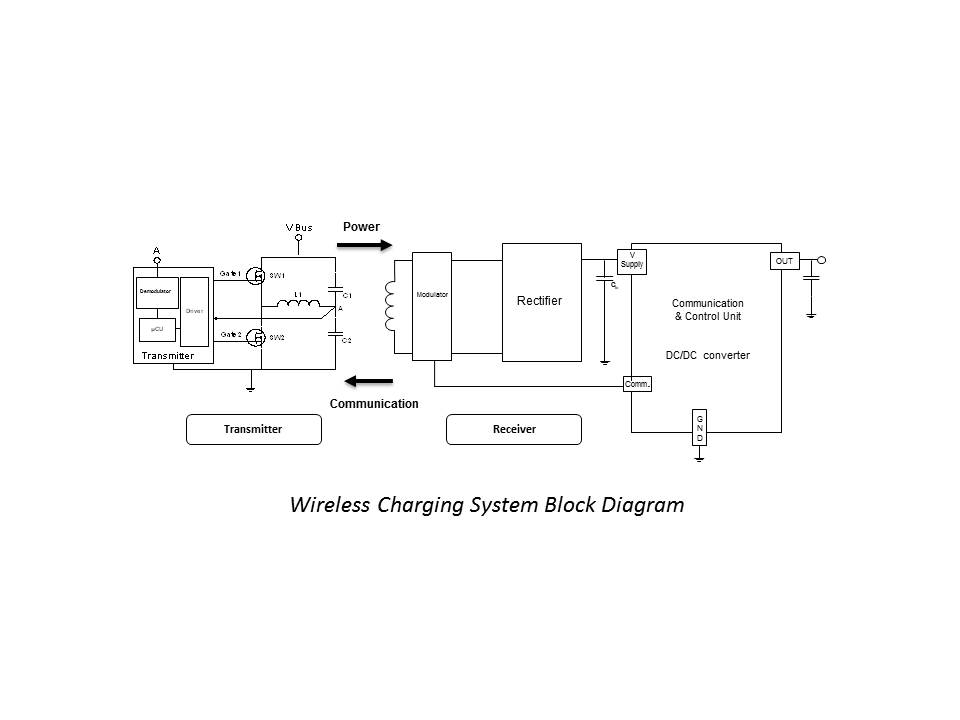
Illustration of an inductive wireless charging system

The company's technology is based upon Inductively Coupled Power Transfer. As the block diagram shows, varying the current in the primary induction coil within a transmitter generates an alternating magnetic field from within a charging spot. The receiver is a second induction coil in the handheld device that takes power from the magnetic field and converts it back into electric current to charge the device battery. An additional part of the technology is the System Control Communication: Data over Coil (DoC) – the Rx sends feedback to Tx by changing the load seen by the Tx coil. The protocol is frequency-based signaling, which enables fast response by the transmitter. Each receiver is equipped with a unique ID (RxID), enabling the system, when installed in public venues, to recognize users and communicate with them. The RxID is communicated as part of the data over coil to the Tx.

== History ==
The company was founded in 2006 by Ran Poliakine. Its first products were launched in 2009. In 2011, General Motors announced that it would integrate Powermat's wireless charging technology into certain vehicles in its 2013 Chevrolet Volt line and would also invest in the private company. In the same year, Powermat also partnered with Leyden Energy, manufacturer of advanced lithium-imide (Li-imide) batteries, in order to develop wireless chargeable batteries, and with Arconas, provider of public seating, to incorporate wireless charging directly into airport seating and lounge areas. Among the first integrations with airports were those at Chicago O'Hare International Airport, Aspen–Pitkin Airport, Eppley Airfield in Omaha, and Toronto Pearson International Airport. Powermat and Procter & Gamble created a joint venture under the Duracell Powermat brand that began operations in January 2012. The entertainer Jay-Z signed on as the "face and voice" of the venture and took an equity stake in the company. As part of a partnership with Madison Square Garden begun in mid-2012, the arena features Duracell Powermat charging surfaces in a number of suites and other areas. In addition, Duracell Powermat charging spots were embedded in Jay-Z's 40/40 Club NYC club tables. A year later, Powermat Technologies, along with Procter & Gamble, founded the Power Matters Alliance, an alliance of semiconductor and consumer electronics industries as well as governmental organizations. The alliance is dedicated to advancing smart and environmental wireless power. AT&T and Starbucks are board members, and among the Alliance's members are Samsung, LG, HTC, BlackBerry, Huawei, ZTE, Texas Instruments, STMicroelectronics, Broadcom, Fairchild Semiconductor, Freescale, IDT, Otterbox, Incipio and Skech.

In October 2012, Powermat and Starbucks announced a pilot program to install Powermat charging surfaces in store tabletops in 17 Boston-area locations. The technology is consistent with Starbucks' environmentally friendly guidelines. As the pilot ended in July 2013, Starbucks decided to bring the Powermat's wireless charging technology to additional locations in Silicon Valley. Powermat announced it had acquired Powerkiss, a developer of integrated wireless charging techniques. Powerkiss, headquartered in Helsinki, Finland, had deployed wireless charging hot spots across Europe since its founding in 2008. In November 2013, the company announced a deployment at some Coffee Bean and Tea Leaf locations. Additional Powermat systems were installed at McDonald's restaurants in New York City and in select locations in Europe. In January 2014, the company, together with Flextronics, agreed to collaborate on embedding wireless power in electronic mobile devices. In March 2015, Samsung included wireless charging in its Galaxy S6 mobile phone series. In June 2015, Powermat and Dupont launched the Dupont Corian charging surface. In January 2016, Powermat rolled out and installed at 150 Starbucks Chicago stores. In December 2016, Elad Dubzinski was appointed the company's chief executive officer.

In September 2017, Apple announced at its annual Keynote event that the new iPhone line-up (iPhone 8, iPhone 8 Plus and iPhone X) would feature inductive wireless charging (Qi standard). This announcement had a significant effect on the wireless charging market, and Powermat was quick to announce that all existing charging spots would be compatible with Qi in order to support iPhone users. A few months later, during the Consumer Electronics Show (CES) in early January, Powermat announced its membership in the Wireless Power Consortium, developer of the Qi standard, and announced its SmartInductive technology. In September 2018, Powermat HQ moved to a new office in the city of Petah Tikva, Israel.
