= Ran Poliakine =

Israeli businessman (1967–2024)

- רן פוליאקין
- Born: 25 October 1967; Haifa, Israel
- Died: 12 January 2024 (aged 56)
- Education: Bezalel Academy of Arts and Design (Did not graduate)
- Occupations: Entrepreneur; Founder of Powermat

Ran Poliakine (Hebrew: רן פוליאקין; 25 October 1967 – 12 January 2024) was an Israeli businessman who was the founder and CEO of Powermat Technologies. Poliakine was an entrepreneur, inventor and industrial designer.

== Biography ==
Ran Poliakine was born in Haifa, Israel. He studied at the Bezalel Academy of Arts and Design in Jerusalem. He was married, had five children, and lived in Motza Elite near Jerusalem.

In 2007, Poliakine founded Powermat Technologies, a company that utilized inductive charging technology to develop wireless power solutions. The Powermat Technology was adopted by General Motors, Procter & Gamble, Duracell, Starbucks, Flextronics, and AT&T. In 2009, Poliakine formed Wellsense, the world's first bedsore monitoring system and used in major hospitals worldwide (Cleveland Clinic, Baylor College of Medicine, Houston Methodist Hospital and Kentucky's Jewish Hospital). In 2012, he cofounded Years of Water Ltd. which produced an affordable and portable home water treatment system, The Water Elephant, a small, portable, cost-effective water treatment solution that utilized an ultraviolet lamp to effectively destroy bacteria, viruses, and protozoa. In 2012, Poliakine established QinFlow Ltd, which produced The Warrior, a portable blood and IV fluid warming device that can be utilized in emergency situations.

In 2012, he cofounded Nanox which sought to develop a cold cathode X-ray source. In 2014, under the direction of Poliakine, Illumigyn, Ltd. developed a ground-breaking pelvic exam system for female health, the Gynescope, an advanced colposcope with a camera system to be utilized by gynecologists to permit early detection of cervical precancerous conditions. The company developed the system with the goal of reducing deaths from cervical cancer and other diseases. Poliakine secured 3 patents for the device.

In 2015, he launched Tap Systems, Inc. which developed a single-hand Bluetooth wearable keyboard, the Tap Strap (by tapping your fingers on any surface, your finger strokes are converted into keystrokes on a virtual keyboard. The system translates a combination of 31 different finger tap combinations into the letters of the alphabet and numbers).

Israel-based SixAI (Poliakine's venture) developed advanced Robotics and AI-based solutions to industry challenges in manufacturing and distribution centers. Its robots are designed to carry out Visual Inspection, Forklift Materials Transport, Materials Handling, Last Mile Delivery, Security, and a variety of other tasks. In 2019, with his venture SixAI, Poliakine, spearheaded a new venture with Musashi Semitsu, a Japanese powertrain manufacturer. The company has developed autonomous robots for use in factories (Visual Inspection Robot that can spot defects with the same accuracy and speed as the human eye, and the Fully Autonomous Forklift Driver). With this technology the company is also launching the world's first robot employment agency. This marks a significant shift in the industry, allowing deployment to come from an OPEX, rather than CAPEX budget. This will be offered by hiring robots at an hourly, or piece rate of pay.

In January 2022, he stepped down as CEO of Nanox, a few months after the company's stocks plummeted.

Poliakine passed on 12 January 2024, at the age of 56 due to an illness.

== Patents ==
- Electron Emitting Construct Configured with Ion Bombardment Resistant, Nanox
- Devices Having and Electron Emitting Structure, Nanox
- X-Ray Tube and a Controller Thereof, Nanox
- X-Ray Tube and a Conditioning Method Thereof, Nanox
- Electron Emitting Construct Configured with Ion Bombardment Resistant, Nanox
- Image Capture Device, Nanox
- Devices Having and Electron Emitting Structure, Nanox
- Multiple patents for the design and operation of an Optical speculum, Illumigyn Ltd
