= Proxemic communication strategies =

Part of nonverbal communication

Proxemic communication deals with the ways that what is communicated in face-to-face conversations may go beyond the overt information being imparted. The communication may be influenced by the degree of proximity and by non-verbal signals including touch, and varies between different cultures. Research in this field has been carried out on cross-cultural differences, and interaction in counseling and clinical settings. "Social engineering"--a practice sharing significant overlap with proxemic communication--is an increasingly prominent attack vector for cybercriminals.

== The field of proxemics ==
Proxemics is one of several subcategories of the study of nonverbal communication. Proxemics can be defined as "the interrelated observations and theories of man's use of space as a specialized elaboration of culture". The term was coined in 1963 by the cultural anthropologist Edward T. Hall.

In his work on proxemics, Hall separated his theory into two overarching categories: personal space and territory. Personal space describes the immediate space surrounding a person, while territory refers to the area which a person may "lay claim to" and defend against others.

== Dimensions of nonverbal communication ==
According to Xu Lin’s article on Cultural Dimensions and Conversational Strategies, "Cultural factors have a great impact on conversational techniques", and there are two basic elements consisted in all conversations: informational and communicative. The informational function deals with passing information to another individual; this is known as the information focused element. Whereas, the communicative function deals with the social principle or aim in the conversation, also known as the element that deals with social relationships and drawing closer to people. Xu Lin studies the different classifications of nonverbal communication brought forth by Edward T. Hall (1959). The different dimensions brought forth by Xu Lin and Prabhu include: Intimate, Personal, Social and Public Distances.

== Common methods ==
One of the primary methods used by Kim, D., Pan, Y., & Park, H. (1998), Merkin, R. S. (2006), Albas, C. (1991) and Graves, J. R., & Robinson, J. D. included Likert-type measures of sampling. Participants would be given surveys, videotaped and observed while receiving and responding to oral questions posed by formally dressed interviewers. Each study consisted of a controlled group and an experimental group and would measure each individual in a specific manner in order to bring forth accurate results. Each method included a sampling base of volunteers with cheap compensation such as a two dollar reward or extra credit in the class for taking part in the experiment.

DiBiase describes touch as differentiating depending on various aspects. All people touch and are touched by others, but there are vast differences in the amount of touching that people do. For example, touching appears to vary by gender, culture, and even age. Although these particular differences in touching behavior are not well understood, historically investigators have thought of touch as expressing control and dominance.

Not only does touch vary by culture, but also age and gender. They continue to explain how some researchers have suggested that some cultures, such as Middle Eastern, Latin America and Southern Europe, could be considered high-contact cultures (interact at closer distances and touch more frequently) much more in social conversations than people from non-contact cultures such as the USA and Northern Europe.

Research by Graves (1976), and Robinson (1976), suggests that an individual's nonverbal behavior is capable of communicating information about the particular individual's feelings and attitudes, regardless of the culture. However, from his research, he concluded that the prominent role was in fact played by nonverbal communication in determining the total meaning of the message, and that the message being conveyed could very well differ depending on the context. Among his findings was that within the client-counselor relationship, the consistency or inconsistency between the counselor's verbal and nonverbal behaviors has been found to be an important determinant of the client's impressions of the counselor as well as of the client's proxemics behavior.

Albas (1991) studied the comfortable proxemic distances assumed by Canadian female students. The cultural group and sex were held constant; however, the comfortable distances seemed to vary from situation to situation. Preston (2005) discusses the proxemics in clinical and administrative settings. He came to the conclusion that the proximity of people to one another when they interact and the configuration of work areas send a message that affects people in different ways. One of his main suggestions was to use observation skills in understanding how and why others interact within or outside their own space. He claims that people choose to rely on their imagination to better receive unspoken messages sent by others through their spatial interactions.
