= Blacks & Whites =

Multi-player economics-themed board game

- Designers: Robert Sommer; Judy Tart
- Publishers: Psychology Today
- Publication: 1970; 55 years ago
- Genres: Board game
- Chance: High (dice rolling, card drawing)
- Skills: Resource management; Financial management; Strategy

Blacks & Whites is a multi-player economics-themed board game inspired by Monopoly that was created in 1970 by Robert Sommer and Judy Tart in partnership with Psychology Today.

== History ==
Blacks & Whites was originally designed in 1970 by University of California, Davis, professor Robert Sommer and Judy Tart. The game was subsequently modified by students testing it out for Psychology Today, which had commissioned the project. With Sommer's permission, the comedy duo Never Sad, comprising Nehemiah Markos and Jed Feiman, designed a 50th anniversary edition of Blacks & Whites that was released in 2021.

== Rules ==
The gameplay of Blacks & Whites is similar to that of Monopoly, with movements on the board made according to the roll of the dice. The object of the game is to own the most properties in various "neighborhoods": the Ghetto Zone, the Integrated Zone, the Suburban Zone, and the Estate Zone. Additionally, players must choose to identify as either "Blacks" or "Whites"; the former begin play with $10,000, whereas the latter start with $1,000,000. "Blacks" are forbidden from directly purchasing property in the Suburban Zone and must have a net worth of $1,000,000 before they can purchase Estate Zone properties. Each player group has their own "opportunity card" deck to draw from. "White" players are immediately ejected from the game upon reaching bankruptcy, while bankrupt "Black" players can live on welfare and collect $5,000 from each "White" player. According to Wyatt H. Day of Swann Auction Galleries, "the game is strategically designed to make a black win impossible".

== Reception ==
According to Wired writer Sebastian Skov Andersen, Blacks & Whites "was popular as an educational tool to teach people about privilege from a young age". Writing for Simulation & Games, E. O. Schild described Blacks & Whites as a "poor game" and an "occasion for role-play", while also remarking that "the weakness in the basic game structure outweighs the potential strength of the good ideas".

== Reviews ==
- Moves #4, p16-17
