= Socio-architecture =

Socio-architecture is a phrase coined by psychologist Humphry Osmond and Canadian architect Kyo Izumi as part of their research for the best architectural form for Osmond's Weyburn Mental Hospital in 1951.

Osmond is best known for his research into the treatment of schizophrenia, and on the other hand the facilitation of mystical experiences, with psychedelic drugs, but his Weyburn hospital became a design research lab to examine the functional aspects of architecture and its impact on the mentally ill. Osmond based his ideas of hospital design on the species-habitat work of German zoologist Heini Hediger, and on the research acid trips he took with Izumi.

Osmond also coined the terms "sociopetal" and "sociofugal" to describe seating arrangement that encouraged or discouraged social interaction. His 1957 article “Function as the Basis of Psychiatric Ward Design” is considered a minor classic. His work regarding architecture was continued by his colleague Robert Sommer.

== See also ==
- Architectural determinism
