= Régis Barroso =

Brazilian politician (1941–2026)

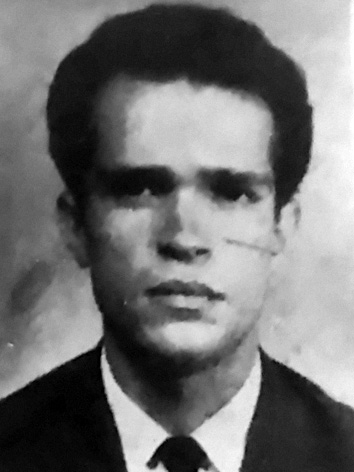
- Barroso in 1967

Member of the Chamber of Deputies of Brazil for Ceará
- In office 2 February 1967 – 1 February 1971

Personal details
- Born: Francisco Régis Monte Barroso; 4 August 1941 Fortaleza, Ceará, Brazil
- Died: 3 May 2026 (aged 84) Fortaleza, Ceará, Brazil
- Party: ARENA
- Education: University of Michigan (BA); Federal University of Ceará (LLD)
- Occupation: Lawyer

Francisco Régis Monte Barroso (4 August 1941 – 3 May 2026) was a Brazilian politician. A member of the National Renewal Alliance, he served in the Chamber of Deputies from 1967 to 1971.

Barroso died in Fortaleza on 3 May 2026, at the age of 84.
