= Cornufer hedigeri =

Conservation status
- Least Concern (IUCN 3.1)

Scientific classification
- Kingdom: Animalia
- Phylum: Chordata
- Class: Amphibia
- Order: Anura
- Family: Ceratobatrachidae
- Genus: Cornufer
- Species: C. hedigeri

Binomial name
- Cornufer hedigeri (Boulenger, 1884)

Synonyms
- Cornufer guppyi Boulenger, 1884; Platymantis guppyi (Boulenger, 1884)

Species of frog

Cornufer hedigeri, commonly known as the Treasury wrinkled ground frog or Solomon Islands giant treefrog, is a species of frog in the family Ceratobatrachidae, named after Henry B. Guppy who collected the holotype from the Treasury Islands. It is widespread in the Solomon Islands archipelago (Papua New Guinea and Solomon Islands), though it is missing from New Georgia and Makira islands.

== Description ==
Specimens of the species Cornufer hedigeri are medium-sized frogs: the holotype measured 68 mm (2.7 in) in snout–vent length. Its back is light brown or pinkish, spotted or dotted with brown, whereas it is whitish below.

Cornufer hedigeri is a very common and abundant species that inhabits closed-canopy rainforest and old regrowth forest. They live in the trees, about 2–20 m (6 ft 7 in – 65 ft 7 in) above the ground. It might be threatened by logging, although its ability to persist in regrown forests suggests it is relatively resilient.
