= Humphry Osmond =

British psychiatrist (1917–2004)

- Born: 1 July 1917; Surrey, England
- Died: 6 February 2004 (aged 86); Appleton, Wisconsin, USA
- Education: King's College London
- Known for: Psychedelic therapy, Socio-architecture theory
- Spouse: Jane Roffey Osmond (1924–2009)
- Scientific career
- Fields: Psychiatry and psychology
- Institutions: St George's Hospital; Weyburn Mental Hospital; New Jersey Psychiatric Institute; University of Alabama at Birmingham

Humphry Fortescue Osmond (1 July 1917 – 6 February 2004) was an English psychiatrist who moved to Canada and later the United States. He is known for inventing the word psychedelic and for his research into interesting and useful applications for psychedelic drugs. Osmond also explored aspects of the psychology of social environments, in particular how they influenced welfare or recovery in mental institutions.

== Biography ==
Osmond was born in Surrey, England, and educated at Haileybury. As a young man, he worked for an architect and attended Guy's Hospital Medical School at King's College London. Following service as a surgeon-lieutenant in the Navy during World War II, Osmond trained to become a psychiatrist.

After World War II, Osmond joined the psychiatric unit at St George's Hospital, London, where he rose to become senior registrar.

=== Work with psychedelics ===
Osmond's time at the hospital proved pivotal in three respects: it was where he met his wife Amy "Jane" Roffey, who was working there as a nurse; he met John Smythies, who became one of his major collaborators; and he first encountered the drugs that became associated with his name, LSD and mescaline. While researching the drugs at St George's, Osmond noticed that they produced similar effects to schizophrenia and became convinced that the disease was caused by a chemical imbalance in the brain. These ideas were not well received amongst the psychiatric community in London at the time. In 1951, Osmond and Smythies moved to Saskatchewan, Canada, to join the staff of the Weyburn Mental Hospital.

At Weyburn, Osmond recruited a group of research psychologists to turn the hospital into a design-research laboratory. There, he conducted a wide variety of patient studies and observations using hallucinogenic drugs, collaborating with Abram Hoffer and others. In 1952, Osmond related the similarity of mescaline to adrenaline molecules, in a theory that implied that schizophrenia might be a form of self-intoxication caused by one's own body. He collected the biographies of recovered schizophrenics and held that psychiatrists can understand the schizophrenic only by understanding the rational way the mind makes sense of distorted perceptions. He pursued this idea with passion, exploring all avenues to gain insight into the shattered perceptions of schizophrenia, holding that the illness arises primarily from distortions of perception. Yet during the same period, Osmond became interested in the potential of psychedelics to foster mind-expanding and mystical experiences.

In 1953, Aldous Huxley was a renowned poet and playwright who, in his twenties, had gone on to achieve success and acclaim as a novelist and widely published essayist. He had lived in the U.S. for well over a decade and gained some experience screenwriting for Hollywood films. Huxley had initiated a correspondence with Osmond. In one letter, Huxley lamented that contemporary education seemed typically to have the unintended consequence of constricting the minds of the educated, closing students' minds to inspiration and many things other than material success and consumerism. In a letter, Huxley asked Osmond whether he would be kind enough to supply a dose of mescaline.

In May of that year, Osmond travelled to the US for a conference and, while there, gave Huxley the requested mescaline and supervised the ensuing experience in Huxley's neighborhood. As a result of his experience, Huxley wrote the book The Doors of Perception in the months following his first mescaline encounter. Huxley was disappointed that the effects that he had expected and hoped for following his correspendence with Osmond did not occur. In the book, he attributed this to aphantasia—the inability to picture something in one's mind. Instead, he re-experienced his everyday surroundings, describing his heightened 'objective' awareness of the folds in his trousers, the drapes in the room, artwork, a drugstore, and the look of the Hollywood Hills while under the influence of mescaline. Osmond's name appears in four footnotes in the book's early pages (in references to articles he wrote about medicinal use of hallucinogenic drugs).

Osmond was respected and trusted enough that in 1955 he was approached by Christopher Mayhew, a politician, and guided Mayhew through a mescaline trip that was filmed for broadcast by the BBC. Though the recording was deemed too controversial and ultimately omitted from the show, Mayhew praised the experience, calling it "the most interesting thing I ever did". Part of the footage was included in the 1986 BBC documentary LSD – The Beyond Within.

Osmond and Abram Hoffer were taught a way to "maximize the LSD experience" by the influential layman Al Hubbard, who came to Weyburn. Thereafter they adopted some of Hubbard's methods.

Osmond first proposed the term "psychedelic" at a meeting of the New York Academy of Sciences in 1956. He said the word meant "mind-manifesting" (from "mind", ψυχή (psyche), and "manifest", δήλος (delos)) and called it "clear, euphonious and uncontaminated by other associations." Huxley had sent Osmond a rhyme containing his own suggested invented word: "To make this mundane world sublime, just half a gram of phanerothyme" (θυμός (thymos) meaning 'spiritedness' in Ancient Greek.) Osmond countered with "To fall in Hell or soar Angelic, you'll need a pinch of psychedelic" (Alternative version: "To fathom Hell or go angelic, just take a pinch of PSYCHEDELIC"

Osmond is also known for a study in the late 1950s in which he attempted to cure alcoholics with LSD. He claimed to have achieved a 50% success rate. Osmond noticed that some drinkers were only able to give up drinking after an episode of delirium tremens and tried to replicate this state in patients by giving them high doses of the drug. This came to be known as the psychedelic treatment model, contrasted to the psycholytic model that used low doses to help release repressed material from the mind which it was hoped would help the psychotherapeutic process. One of Osmond's patients during this time was Bill W., co-founder of Alcoholics Anonymous. But with psychedelics' growing reputation for enabling spiritual insight, Bill W. hoped to recapture a mystical state of consciousness that he had experienced, years earlier, without a drug.

=== Involvement with the Native American Church ===
Osmond participated in a Native American Church ceremony in which he ingested peyote, regarded by the Native Americans as sacred. His hosts were Plains Indians, members of the Red Pheasant Band. The all-night ceremony took place at Cando, Saskatchewan, near North Battleford (in the region of the South Saskatchewan River). Osmond published his report on the experience in Tomorrow magazine, Spring 1961. He reported details of the ceremony, the environment in which it took place, the peyote's effects, his hosts' courtesy, and his conjectures about the experience's meaning for them and for the Native American Church.

=== Other interests ===
Peripherally related to his interest in drug-assisted therapeutics, Osmond conducted research on the long-term effects of institutionalization. He had interpreted and described the peyote ceremony he had experienced, with its tepee setting and its particular social pattern, in terms that drew attention to its contrast with the psychiatric institutions of his day. Osmond began a line of research into what he called "socio-architecture" to improve patient settings, coining the terms "sociofugal" and "sociopetal", starting Robert Sommer's career, and contributing to environmental psychology. (Sociofugal refers to a grouping of people arranged so that each can maintain some privacy from the others, while sociopetal refers to a grouping of people arranged so that each can see and interact with the others.)

Osmond's interests included the application of Jung's Typology of personality to group dynamics. He and Richard Smoke developed refinements of Jung's typology and applied them to analysis of the presidents and other world figures. Osmond also studied parapsychology.

Later, Osmond became director of the Bureau of Research in Neurology and Psychiatry at the New Jersey Neuro Psychiatric Institute (NJNPI) in Princeton, where he collaborated with Bernard Aaronson in hypnosis experiments. Still later, he became a professor of psychology at the University of Alabama in Birmingham. Osmond co-wrote 11 books and was widely published throughout his career.

Osmond died of cardiac arrhythmia in 2004.

== See also ==
- Socio-architecture
