= Souris Valley Mental Health Hospital =

Former hospital in Saskatchewan, Canada

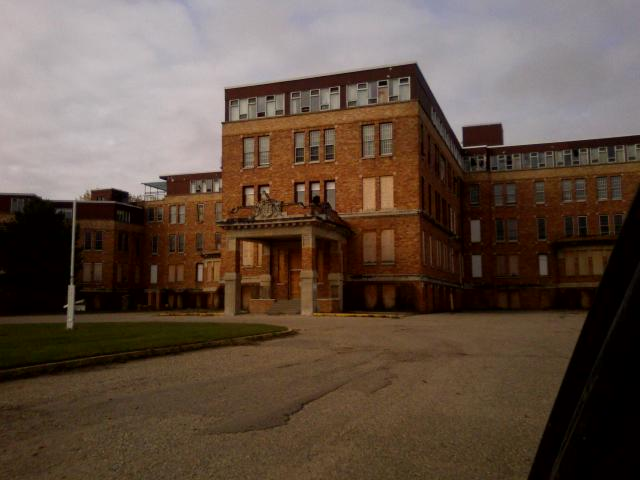
- Souris Valley Extended Care Centre (Oct 2008)

Geography
- Location: Weyburn, Saskatchewan, Canada
- Coordinates: 49°40′26.21″N 103°52′27.69″W

Organization
- Care system: Public
- Type: Community

Services
- Beds: 900 (initial); 3,000 (peak)

History
- Founded: December 29th, 1921
- Closed: 2006 (demolished 2009)

Souris Valley Mental Health Hospital, also called the Weyburn Mental Hospital, was a public hospital in Weyburn, Saskatchewan. Originally called the Saskatchewan Hospital when opened in 1921, it was the largest building in The British Commonwealth and the most expensive building erected in Saskatchewan at that time. In its beginning, the hospital housed 607 patients. Weyburn's hospital was considered on the cutting edge of experimental treatments for people with mental health issues. The facility had a reputation of leading the way in therapeutic programming. At its peak, the facility was home to approximately 2,500 patients. The hospital was an early example of socio-architecture.

== Therapy ==
At the hospital, patients were exposed to different forms of occupational therapy, ranging from farm work to long walks. This work was unpaid until reforms began in the 1950s. Starting in 1954, other forms of recreational therapy were introduced, including dancing, card playing, sing-a-longs and skating. Many of the early techniques used on patients by the hospital included insulin shock therapy, hydrotherapy, lobotomy, and electroshock; by 1954 experiments using Lysergic acid diethylamide (LSD) therapy were done on volunteer staff and eventually applied to patients. Much of this early work conducted by Humphry Osmond and Abram Hoffer. The first LSD experiments were done on patients with chronic alcoholism who were institutionalized at Weyburn. Their conclusions from these experiments were that LSD had a 50 per cent chance of helping alcoholics overcome their addictions. Erika Dyck, a historian at the University of Saskatchewan argues that the experiments conducted at Weyburn throughout the late 1950s and 1960s were crucial to the reconstruction of alcoholism as a disease, because the drug provided a potential quick cure.

== Deinstitutionalization ==
As deinstitutionalization became commonplace during the mid to late 1960s, economic pressures forced a local debate in Weyburn about the closure of the hospital. Attempts to instate the Saskatchewan Plan, which would have provided resources for released patients, failed, yet deinstitutionalization was implemented rapidly in 1964. Chris Dooley cites numbers in the hospital as falling by two-thirds within five years. Ultimately, the provincial government decided to open two new institutions in the place of the hospital: a geriatric care facility and a regional psychiatric centre.

There were several attempts to save the historic building that made up the hospital complex. However, in 2009 the decision was made by the city to demolish the buildings. A tender for the demolition of the building was awarded to Demco Decommissioning & Environmental Management Company of West Seneca, New York on September 19, 2008. The demolition was completed by the end of 2009.

The history of the facility is explored in the documentary Weyburn: An Archaeology of Madness.
