= Robert Sommer =

American psychologist (1929–2021)

Robert Sommer (April 26, 1929 – February 27, 2021) was an internationally known Environmental Psychologist and held the position of Distinguished Professor of Psychology Emeritus at the University of California, Davis. Sommer wrote 14 books and over 600 articles, he was best known for his book Personal Space: The Behavioral Basis of Design (1969), which discusses the influence of the environment on human activities.

"[Man] will adapt to hydrocarbons in the air, detergents in the water, crime in the streets, and crowded recreational areas. Good design becomes a meaningless tautology if we consider that man will be reshaped to fit whatever environment he creates. The long-range question is not so much what sort of environment we want, but what sort of man we want." ~ Robert Sommer

== Life and career ==
Robert Sommer was born in New York City. He received his Ph.D. from the University of Kansas in 1956 and after teaching in Sweden and the University of Alberta, he arrived at the University of California, Davis in 1963. At Davis, he chaired four departments: Psychology (1964–70); Environmental Design (1991-1994), Rhetoric & Communication (1994–95), and Art (1997-2000) and was a Distinguished Professor of Psychology Emeritus (since 2003). Though he may be best known for his book Personal Space: The Behavioral Basis of Design, first published in 1969, he has written 14 other books and more than 600 publications on a variety of subjects. His writings on environmental psychology include research in mental hospitals, libraries, classrooms, and living spaces. Sommer also has written a number of articles and a book on mushrooms, and other nontechnical subjects and his work has appeared in the journal Worm Runner's Digest, which publishes scientific papers alongside satirical articles.

Sommer's consulting work included the design of bicycle paths, residence halls, geriatric housing, airports, offices, prisons, farmers' markets, and other facilities. He designed the board game Blacks & Whites in 1970 together with Judy Tart, as part of a project commissioned by Psychology Today. He also received a number of awards including: City-University Research Award, City of Davis; Research Award, California Alliance for the Mentally Ill; Career Research Award, Environmental Design Research Association; Kurt Lewin Award, Division 9 APA; Fulbright Award to Estonia, USSR; President-Elect 1998–1999, President 1999–2000, APA Div. 34, Doctorem Honoris Causa, Tallinn Pedagogical University.

== Thought ==
Sommer was influenced by his studies on environmental psychology with Dr. Humphry Osmond, a psychiatrist who researched hallucinogens. Osmond coined the term psychedelic and also worked in mental hospitals researching social environments and how they affect recovery.

Some scholars see Environmental Psychology as strictly a sub-discipline of Psychology or Social Psychology; others see it as an entirely interdisciplinary study. Sommer viewed Environmental Psychology as both a sub-discipline within the behavioral sciences as well as an interdisciplinary study that involves a variety of disciplines and professions. His view of the discipline is reflected in his writing style; he communicates his ideas without technical, psychological jargon. Though his book, Personal Space, was not specifically written for people outside the field of Environmental Psychology, it is highly readable and thus, accessible to those designers or architects who may actually have the ability to influence building design.

== Works ==
On Personal Space

Sommer made the distinction between personal space and territory: "The concepts of 'personal space' can be distinguished from that of 'territory' in several ways. The most important difference is that personal space is carried around while territory is relatively stationary. The animal or man will usually mark the boundaries of his territory so that they are visible to others, but the boundaries of personal space are invisible. Personal space has the body as its center, while territory does not. Often the center of territory is the home of the animal or man. Animals will usually fight to maintain dominion over their territory but will withdraw if others intrude into their personal space."

In his best known book Personal Space: The Behavioral Basis of Design, first published in 1969, Sommer argued that buildings should be built first for function (their usefulness to the user), not form (how they look). The book is divided into two sections: the first section is theoretical, and the second section concerns methods and their applications. In addition to this book, Sommer wrote many articles on personal space as well.

On Learning And The Classroom

Another theme in Sommer's research was the structure of the classroom and how it affects learning. As a high school student, Sommer himself experienced the difficulty of learning in a classroom where he was unable to see the blackboard due to the poor design of the room. He wrote that he struggled in the class until, later in the semester, it moved to a new room where he got a front row seat. There, he could see the blackboard and his "grades improved markedly". Sommer devoted a chapter to the effect of classroom structure on learning in his book Personal Space, and also wrote many journal articles on the topic.

Though the 1960s and 70s were a time of innovation in educational curricula, teaching methods, and classrooms, there was not much thought given to the physical environment of the classroom and how it might affect learning. Sommer introduced two important terms in his book Tight Spaces: Hard Architecture and How to Humanize It. First, the "open classroom", which he described as being a "more informally arranged and less rigidly structured space", and "open education", a loosening of the current social hierarchy in education where teachers are strictly the sources of knowledge and students only learners. Sommer stated that though the addition of "open classrooms" cannot increase student participation without there also being an environment of "open education", no shift in hierarchy is likely without a change in the construction or arrangement of the classroom.

The Soft Classroom is an article written by Sommer and Olsen describing a study they conducted on the impact of classroom design on learning. It described the difference in student participation observed in two differently arranged classrooms.

Prison Architecture

Robert worked on a federal task force consulting for prisons, he studied their built environment and the relation to psychology. His aim was to apply architectural strategies he had used in mental health facilities to the prison setting. Robert's primary concern throughout his research was whether ‘hard architecture’ instills any sort of reform on the individual, or whether it merely perpetuates the idea of punishment. Tight Spaces: Hard Architecture and How to Humanize It, Author: Robert Sommer, talks about his observations into the soulless architecture of these institutions, and the dehumanizing nature of a prison. Robert faced a difficulty in obtaining reliable data while interviewing in prisons. In one institution he was not allowed to talk to the guards, and was told that interviewing prisoners would violate their privacy. While in another prison, he was barred from interviewing the guards themselves.

Street Art

Sommer's book Street Art (1975) discussed "the urban community mural in the U.S.A." The community mural is created by artists in collaboration with the local community so the art reflects the local culture. "Some of the chapter topics are: The New Mural Movement; definitions of 'street art' forms; the politics of 'street art'; the Emeryville, California, mudflats, a site for group sculpture; a guide for Locating and Photographing Street Art; and a final chapter concerned with less common 'street art' locations and the future of this type of art."

In Street Art Sommer stated "the important question is whether painters, writers and poets are obliged to go beyond reflection to interpretation and prescription" and, in comparing street artists to those who display their work in a gallery, even goes so far as to say: "one can tell very little about the issues affecting public consciousness by examining the work of studio artists..." and "she [the new muralist] cannot afford the haughty contempt that the studio painter may feel for purchasers and patrons ...".

Sommer's work has been called "valuable for drawing attention to the proliferation of a noncommercial, popular art form in the U.S.A.", however there are also some criticisms of the book. Wayne Enstice, in his review of Street Art noted "A serious deficiency of his book is the abrasive way he chooses to treat the question"..."Do Social imperatives demand redefinition of the role of artists?" He complains that "Readers are asked to measure the accomplishments of community motivated artists against an antagonistic and oversimplified estimation of studio artists...". Enstice also dislikes Sommer's division between text and art, saying that it is "inappropriate".

== Bibliography ==
- 1969 Personal Space: The Behavioral Basis of Design, Englewood Cliffs, N.J, ISBN 0-13-657577-3
- 1972 Design Awareness Rinehart
- 1974 Tight spaces : hard architecture and how to humanize it, Englewood Cliffs, N.J. : Prentice-Hall
- 1975 Street art, New York, Links Books
- 1975 Sidewalk Fossils, with Harriet Becker Walker
- 1976 The end of imprisonment, New York : Oxford University Press
- 1978 The mind's eye : imagery in everyday life, Palo Alto, California, Dale Seymour Publications
- 1980 A Practical Guide to Behavioral Research, further editions in 1986, 1991, 1997 and 2002 (5th Ed.)
- 1963 Expertland (Doubleday)
- 1980 Farmers' Markets of America (Capra)
- 1983 Social Design (Prentice-Hall)
- 2000, 2003 An Authoritative Guide to Self-Help Resources (2nd Edition and later, Revised Edition) with Norcross, Santrock et al. (Guilford)
- 2003 Milieux et modes de vie (Infolio)
- 2008 Personal Space Updated (Bosko Books)

== See also ==
- Nonverbal communication
- Socio-architecture
