= Aleksei Turovski =

Estonian zoologist

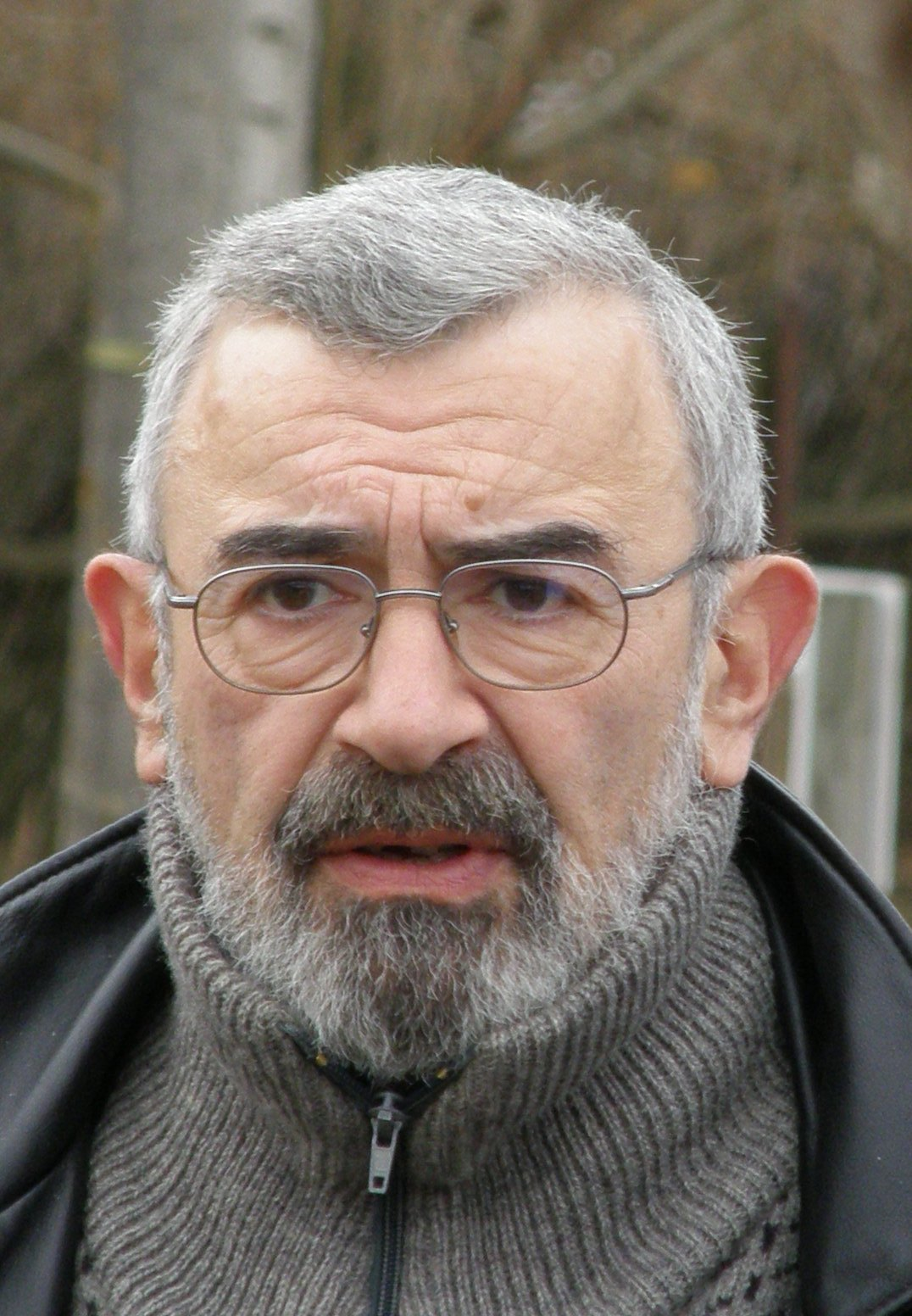
Aleksei Turovski (2009)

Aleksei Turovski (born 4 August 1946 in Moscow) is an Estonian zoologist and ethologist, specialising in parasitology and zoosemiotics. In 1973, he graduated from Tartu University with a degree in zoology; since 1972 he's been working in the Tallinn Zoo. In 1976–2001, Turovski worked in the Estonian Marine Institute.

Turovski has been recognised as the Guardian of Estonian Life Science (Estonian: Eesti Eluteaduse Hoidja) in 2007 for his work in popularising cultures of animals.
