= Cross-cultural code-switching =

Topic in psychology

In cross-cultural management and organizational psychology, cross-cultural code-switching refers to the conscious act of modifying one's behavior, communication style, or self-presentation when interacting with people from a different cultural background, in order to accommodate the cultural norms of the other party.

== Concept and theory ==
This concept was first introduced by Andrew Molinsky, an organizational psychologist, as an extension of the sociolinguistic concept of "code-switching" into the field of management. While linguistic code-switching focuses on alternating between languages, cross-cultural code-switching goes further by shifting the emphasis from text and language to the alternation between culturally ingrained patterns of behavior, for example, from indirect to direct communication, from relationship-oriented to task-oriented styles, or from informal to formal registers.

The theoretical foundation of cross-cultural code-switching draws primarily on Edward T. Hall's distinction between high-context and low-context cultures. In high-context cultures such as many Asian and Arab societies, communication is often implicit, indirect, and tactful; the core issue is not stated directly, but rather expressed in a polished or roundabout way. In contrast, in low-context cultures such as Europe and the United States, communication is typically explicit, direct, and straightforward, with individuals stating their needs simply. When colleagues from different contextual background collaborate, they need to change their habitual communication styles in order to reduce misunderstanding, build trust, and achieve more effective collaboration.

== Function and challenges ==
According to Molinsky, when people attempt cross-cultural code-switching, they face two psychological challenges: the task performance dimension, which "proficiently execute a novel and possible complex set of behaviors in a manner that will be judged appropriate by an evaluative audience", and the identity dimension, which "grapple internally with the personal meaning of the behavior... especially in terms of how the new behavior might conflict with internalized value and beliefs." In a subsequent longitudinal study of foreign-born professionals in the United States, Molinsky distinguished two approaches: the instrumental approach, which involves forcing oneself to perform the behavior while suppressing internal discomfort, and the integrative approach, which reduces internal resistance by adopting the new culture's perspective and by making personalized adjustments. This study found that the integrative approach leads to a greater sense of authenticity and long-term adaptation.

Cross-cultural code-switching is particularly important in multinational corporations and global virtual teams because employees in these environments must frequently navigate cultural differences. Empirical studies show that members of high-context cultures often switch to a more direct, task-oriented style when communicating with low-context colleagues. For example, in a study of Malaysian employees working in global virtual teams, participants reported deliberately adopting "directness in speech," "openness during knowledge sharing," and "agenda-oriented aims" to accommodate their Western colleagues. Such switching has been shown to improve knowledge sharing, decision-making efficiency, and interpersonal trust.

== Criticism of the concept ==
However, cross-cultural code-switching is not without criticism. Research on language barriers in multinational teams has found that when team members use a language that others do not understand, such behavior may be perceived as exclusionary, impolite, or even malevolent, thereby reducing trust among team members. Moreover, unlike linguistic code-switching, cross-cultural code-switching relies heavily on cooperation among colleagues and leaders, and typically requires a longer period of adjustment to be successful. Importantly, cross-cultural code-switching retains the core meaning of alternating between distinct cultural-behavioral systems, and this alternation is often a response to power dynamics or social expectation.
