= Paralanguage =

Communication of additional meaning, nuance, or emotion in speech

Paralanguage, also known as vocalics, is a component of meta-communication that may modify meaning, give nuanced meaning, or convey emotion, by using suprasegmental techniques such as prosody, including pitch, volume, intonation, etc. It is sometimes defined as relating to nonphonemic properties only. Paralanguage may be expressed consciously or unconsciously.

The study of paralanguage is known as paralinguistics and was invented by George L. Trager in the 1950s, while he was working at the Foreign Service Institute of the U.S. Department of State. His colleagues at the time included Henry Lee Smith, Charles F. Hockett (working with him on using descriptive linguistics as a model for paralanguage), Edward T. Hall developing proxemics, and Ray Birdwhistell developing kinesics. Trager published his conclusions in 1958, 1960 and 1961.

His work has served as a basis for all later research, especially those investigating the relationship between paralanguage and culture (since paralanguage is learned, it differs by language and culture). A good example is the work of John J. Gumperz on language and social identity, which specifically describes paralinguistic differences between participants in intercultural interactions. The film Gumperz made for BBC in 1982, Multiracial Britain: Cross talk, does a particularly good job of demonstrating cultural differences in paralanguage and their impact on relationships.

Paralinguistic information, because it is phenomenal, belongs to the external speech signal (Ferdinand de Saussure's parole) but not to the arbitrary conmodality. Even vocal language has some paralinguistic as well as linguistic properties that can be seen (lip reading, McGurk effect), and even felt, e.g. by the Tadoma method.

== Aspects of the speech signal ==
=== Perspectival aspects ===
Speech signals arrive at a listener's ears with acoustic properties that may allow listeners to identify location of the speaker (sensing distance and direction, for example). Sound localization functions in a similar way also for non-speech sounds. The perspectival aspects of lip reading are more obvious and have more drastic effects when head turning is involved.

=== Organic aspects ===
The speech organs of different speakers differ in size. As children grow up, their organs of speech become larger, and there are differences between male and female adults. The differences concern not only size, but also proportions. They affect the pitch of the voice and to a substantial extent also the formant frequencies, which characterize the different speech sounds. The organic quality of speech has a communicative function in a restricted sense, since it is merely informative about the speaker. It will be expressed independently of the speaker's intention.

=== Expressive aspects ===
Paralinguistic cues such as loudness, rate, pitch, pitch contour, and to some extent formant frequencies of an utterance, contribute to the emotive or attitudinal quality of an utterance. Typically, attitudes are expressed intentionally and emotions without intention, but attempts to fake or to hide emotions are not unusual.

Consequently, paralinguistic cues relating to expression have a moderate effect of semantic marking. That is, a message may be made more or less coherent by adjusting its expressive presentation. For instance, upon hearing an utterance such as "I drink a glass of wine every night before I go to sleep" is coherent when made by a speaker identified as an adult, but registers a small semantic anomaly when made by a speaker identified as a child. This anomaly is significant enough to be measured through electroencephalography, as an N400. Autistic individuals have a reduced sensitivity to this and similar effects.

Emotional tone of voice, itself paralinguistic information, has been shown to affect the resolution of lexical ambiguity. Some words have homophonous partners; some of these homophones appear to have an implicit emotive quality, for instance, the sad "die" contrasted with the neutral "dye"; uttering the sound /dai/ in a sad tone of voice can result in a listener writing the former word significantly more often than if the word is uttered in a neutral tone.

=== Linguistic aspects ===
Ordinary phonetic transcriptions of utterances reflect only the linguistically informative quality. The problem of how listeners factor out the linguistically informative quality from speech signals is a topic of current research.

Some of the linguistic features of speech, in particular of its prosody, are paralinguistic or pre-linguistic in origin. A most fundamental and widespread phenomenon of this kind is described by John Ohala as the "frequency code". This code works even in communication across species. It has its origin in the fact that the acoustic frequencies in the voice of small vocalizers are high, while they are low in the voice of large vocalizers. This gives rise to secondary meanings such as "harmless", "submissive", "unassertive", which are naturally associated with smallness, while meanings such as "dangerous", "dominant", and "assertive" are associated with largeness. In most languages, the frequency code also serves the purpose of distinguishing questions from statements. It is universally reflected in expressive variation, and it is reasonable to assume that it has phylogenetically given rise to the sexual dimorphism that lies behind the large difference in pitch between average female and male adults.

In text-only communication such as email, chatrooms and instant messaging, paralinguistic elements can be displayed by emoticons, font and color choices, capitalization and the use of non-alphabetic or abstract characters. Nonetheless, paralanguage in written communication is limited in comparison with face-to-face conversation, sometimes leading to misunderstandings.

== Specific forms of paralinguistic respiration ==
=== Gasps ===
A gasp is a kind of paralinguistic respiration in the form of a sudden and sharp inhalation of air through the mouth. A gasp may indicate difficulty breathing and a panicked effort to draw air into the lungs. Gasps also occur from an emotion of surprise, shock or disgust. Like a sigh, a yawn, or a moan, a gasp is often an automatic and unintentional act. Gasping is closely related to sighing, and the inhalation characterizing a gasp induced by shock or surprise may be released as a sigh if the event causing the initial emotional reaction is determined to be less shocking or surprising than the observer first believed.

As a symptom of physiological problems, apneustic respirations (a.k.a. apneusis), are gasps related to the brain damage associated with a stroke or other trauma.

=== Sighs ===
A sigh is a kind of paralinguistic respiration in the form of a deep and especially audible, single exhalation of air out of the mouth or nose, that humans use to communicate emotion. It is a voiced pharyngeal fricative, sometimes associated with a guttural glottal breath exuded in a low tone. It often arises from a negative emotion, such as dismay, dissatisfaction, boredom, or futility. A sigh can also arise from positive emotions such as relief, particularly in response to some negative situation ending or being avoided. Like a gasp, a yawn, or a moan, a sigh is often an automatic and unintentional act.

Scientific studies show that babies sigh after 50 to 100 breaths. This serves to improve the mechanical properties of lung tissue, and it also helps babies to develop a regular breathing rhythm. Behaviors equivalent to sighing have also been observed in animals such as dogs, monkeys, and horses.

In text messages and internet chat rooms, or in comic books, a sigh is usually represented with the word itself, 'sigh', possibly within asterisks, *sigh*.

Sighing is also a reflex, governed by a few neurons.

=== Moans and groans ===
Moans and groans are both extended sounds emanating from the throat, typically indicating pain, and occasionally displeasure. Moans and groans are also made while engaging in sexual activity. Moaning and groaning is additionally traditionally associated with ghosts, and their supposed experience of suffering in the afterlife.

=== Throat clearing ===
Throat clearing is a metamessaging nonverbal form of communication used in announcing one's presence upon entering the room or approaching a group. It is done by individuals who perceive themselves to be of higher rank than the group they are approaching and utilize the throat-clear as a form of communicating this perception to others. It can convey nonverbalized disapproval.

In chimpanzee social hierarchy, this utterance is a sign of rank, directed by alpha males and higher-ranking chimps to lower-ranking ones and signals a mild warning or a slight annoyance.

As a form of metacommunication, the throat-clear is acceptable only to signal that a formal business meeting is about to start. It is not acceptable business etiquette to clear one's throat when approaching a group on an informal basis; the basis of one's authority has already been established and requires no further reiteration by this ancillary nonverbal communication.

=== Mhm ===
Mhm (or "mm hmm") is between a literal language and movement, by making a noise "hmm" or "mhm", to make a pause for the conversation or as a chance to stop and think.

The "mhm" utterance is often used in narrative interviews, such as an interview with a disaster survivor or sexual violence victim. In this kind of interview, it is better for the interviewers or counselors not to intervene too much when an interviewee is talking. The "mhm" assures the interviewee that they are being heard and can continue their story. Observing emotional differences and taking care of an interviewee's mental status is an important way to find slight changes during conversation.

=== Huh? ===
"Huh?", meaning "what?" (that is, used when an utterance by another is not fully heard or requires clarification), is an essentially universal expression, but may be a normal word (learned like other words) and not paralanguage.

Huh is claimed to be a universal syllable. A 2013 study suggested that the word/syllable huh is perhaps the most recognized syllable throughout the world. It is an interrogative which crosses geography, language, cultures and nationalities.

== Physiology of paralinguistic comprehension ==
=== fMRI studies ===
Several studies have used the fMRI paradigm to observe brain states brought about by adjustments of paralinguistic information. One such study investigated the effect of interjections that differed along the criteria of lexical index (more or less "wordy") as well as neutral or emotional pronunciation; a higher hemodynamic response in auditory cortical gyri was found when more robust paralinguistic data was available. Some activation was found in lower brain structures such as the pons, perhaps indicating an emotional response.

== See also ==
- Business communication
- Intercultural competence
- Kinesics
- Meta message
- Meta-communication
- Metacommunicative competence
- Prosody (linguistics)
- Proxemics
