= Extension transference =

Symbolic sub-division of a goal

Within anthropology, extension transference is the symbolic sub-division of a particular goal or purpose so that the sub-divided concepts seem fragmented from the original purpose.

"…when applied to language and experience, becomes a useful theoretical concept. Thus, spoken language is a symbolization of something that happened, is happening or will happen. Written language as an extension of the spoken form is therefore a symbolization of symbolization! This intellectual manoeuvre Hall terms extension transference. The extension can become confused with or take the place of the process described."

"Extension transference is a phenomenon that occurs when we create systems to help us do things more efficiently and effectively and in ways that we can measure and control. Often these are processes that we once did quite naturally on our own."

The term was coined by the American anthropologist Edward T. Hall in his book Beyond Culture (1976).

== See also ==
- Anthropology
- Cultural anthropology
- Deferred reference
- Social anthropology
- Sociology of culture
- Symbolic interactionism
