= Meta-communication =

Communication about how information is meant to be interpreted

Meta-communication is a secondary communication (including indirect cues) about how a piece of information is meant to be interpreted. It is based on the idea that the same message accompanied by different meta-communication can mean something entirely different, including its opposite, as in irony. The term was brought to prominence by Gregory Bateson to refer to "communication about communication", which he expanded to: "all exchanged cues and propositions about (a) codification and (b) relationship between the communicators".

== Origin of the concept ==
Gregory Bateson invented the term in 1951. Bateson suggested the significance of metacommunication in 1951, and then elaborated upon one particular variation, the message "this is play," in 1956. A critical fact for Bateson was that every message could have a metacommunicative element, and typically, each message held metacommunicative information about how to interpret other messages. He saw no distinction in type of message, only a distinction in function.

Some metacommunicative signals are nonverbal. The term kinesics, referring to body motion communication and occasionally employed by Bateson, was first used in 1952 by Ray Birdwhistell, an anthropologist who wished to study how people communicate through posture, gesture, stance, and movement. Part of Birdwhistell's work involved filming people in social situations and analyzing them to show different levels of communication not clearly seen otherwise. Birdwhistell's research was influenced by Margaret Mead and Gregory Bateson; all three were participants in the Macy Conferences in Group Processes, and both Birdwhistell and Bateson were part of a later multidisciplinary collaboration, The Natural History of an Interview.

From 1952–1962, Bateson directed a research project on communication. This paid particular attention to logical paradoxes including Russell's paradox 1901 and to Bertrand Russell's Theory of Types, Russell's solution to it. Bateson and his associates here pioneered the concept of meta-communication - something that means different (often contradictory) things at different levels. Meta-communication is thought to be a characteristic feature of complex systems.

== Studies and areas of research ==
=== Meta-language and logic ===
In 1975, Frits Staal related the term to the metalanguage concept that is found in logic both in Western and Indian traditions. Staal considered the term metalanguage, or its German or Polish equivalent, to have been introduced in 1933 by the logician Alfred Tarski, whom he credits with having made apparent its real significance.

Russell's 1902 solution to his logical paradox comes in large part from the so-called vicious circle principle, that no propositional function can be defined prior to specifying the function's scope of application. In other words, before a function can be defined, one must first specify exactly those objects to which the function will apply (the function's domain). For example, before defining that the predicate "is a prime number", one first needs to define the collection of objects that might possibly satisfy the predicate, namely the set, N, of natural numbers. It functions as a formal definition of the function of meta-communication in communication.

=== Ivan Pavlov: Context as meta-signaling about primary signal ===
Ivan Pavlov had learned that the ringing of the bell signaled "food is on the way" in his experiment in which dogs were trained to salivate upon hearing a bell ring. This was accomplished by ringing a bell just prior to feeding the dogs. After repeating this procedure for some time it was found that the dogs would salivate after hearing the bell - without the need for food being presented.

Something that is not often discussed in context with this experiment is the fact that the dogs would not salivate unless they were wearing a special harness. When exposed to the bell ringing without wearing the harness, the dogs did not salivate. The dogs only salivated upon hearing the bell while wearing the harness. The bell ringing was direct communication of information, but the context of the communication also conveyed information.

=== Communication Theory ===
The concept of metacommunication has also been related to Communication Theory. Mateus (2017), influenced by Derrida's Graphematic Structure of Communication, suggested to see metacommunication as a self-differentiating redundancy. The concept here "describes communication as an ad infinitum process in which every communication supposes always more communication. Metacommunication is the answer to the relationship level of communication and that's why we postulate metacommunication as a re-communicating communication" (Mateus, 2017).

=== Self-referentiality in mass media ===
In a 2001 study, it was used to discuss self-referentiality in mass media covering politics and was explained as a consequence of the political public relations' presence in media themselves.

== Metamessage ==
In Bateson's works, metamessage was defined (1972) as a refinement of his earlier notion of "mood sign[al]"s from his works of the 1950s. Invoking Bertrand Russell's Theory of Logical Types, Bateson envisaged a potentially infinite hierarchy of messages, metamessages, meta-metamessages and so forth, each metamessage deterministically providing the full context for the interpretation of subordinate messages. Being rather technical, his definition was misunderstood, and metamessage appropriated with the same meaning as subtext, especially in the field of business communication. Additionally, Bateson's strictly hierarchical theory was criticized for not reflecting some real-world communication phenomena, where any signal (regardless of level) can be deceitful.

== See also ==
- Meta message
- Paralanguage
- Prosody (linguistics)
