= Taos phonology =

Taos is a Tanoan language spoken by several hundred people in New Mexico, in the United States. The main description of its phonology was contributed by George L. Trager in a (pre-generative) structuralist framework. Earlier considerations of the phonetics-phonology were by John P. Harrington and Jaime de Angulo. Trager's first account was in Trager (1946) based on fieldwork 1935-1937, which was then substantially revised in Trager (1948) (due in part to the inclusion of juncture phonemes and newly collected data in 1947 in the analysis). The description below takes Trager (1946) as the main point of departure and notes where this differs from the analysis of Trager (1948). Harrington's description (although from a different period) is more similar to Trager (1946). Certain comments from a generative perspective are noted in a comparative work Hale (1967).

== Segments ==
The two following sections detail phonetic information about Taos phonological segments (i.e., consonants and vowels), as well as their phonological patterning in morphophonemic alternations.

=== Consonants ===
Trager (1946) lists 27 consonants (25 native) for Taos, although in his later analysis he posited 18 consonants.

		Bilabial	Dental		Alveolar	Palatal	Velar		Glottal
		Bilabial	median	lateral	Alveolar	Palatal	plain	labial	Glottal
Stop	voiced	b	d				ɡ		
Stop	unaspirated	p	t			tʃ	k	kʷ	ʔ
Stop	aspirated	pʰ	tʰ						
Stop	ejective	pʼ	tʼ			tʃʼ	kʼ	kʷʼ	
Fricative		(f)		ɬ	s		x	xʷ	h
Nasal		m	n						
Flap					(ɾ)				
Approximant				l		j		w	

Words exemplifying Taos consonants are in the table below:

Consonant	Word-initial position			Word-medial position		
Consonant	IPA	Trager	Gloss	IPA	Trager	Gloss
b	ˌbɑ̄jiˈʔīnæ	bòyi’ína	'valley'	ˈʔĩẽsiæbæ̃	į́ęsiabą	'he kicked'
p	ˈpǣ	pá	'he made'	ˌtʃūˈpǣnæ	cùpána	'judge' (noun)
pʰ	ˌpʰūjuˈʔūnæ	phùyu’úna	'fly' (noun)	ˌkùˈpʰūɑ̄ne	kȕphúone	'act of dropping'
pʼ	ˈpʼɑ̄næ	p’óna	'moon'	ˌwɑ̀ˈpʼɤ̄ɑ̄ti	wȍp’ə́oti	'he didn't lose it'
m	ˈmæ̃̄kunæ	mą́kuna	'grandchild'	ˌkʷẽ̄ˈmũ̄næ	kwę̀mų́na	'carpenter's apron'
d	–			ˌʔɑ̀ˈdēnemæ̃	ȍdénemą	'jaw'
t	ˌtùtʃuˈlɑ̄næ	tȕculóna	'hummingbird'	ˌtʃīǣˈtūnæ̃	cìatúną	'legging'
tʰ	ˌtʰĩ̄ẽ̄ˈʔēnæ	thį̀ę’éna	'stomach'	ˈtɤ̄ɑ̄tʰɑ	tə́otho	'Taos pueblo'
tʼ	ˈtʼǣwænæ̃	t’áwaną	'wheel'	ˈmæ̃̀tʼemæ̃	mą̂t’emą	'he hit it'
n	ˌnæ̃ˈlēnemæ̃	ną̀lénemą	'aspen'	ˌkɤ̄ˈnēnemæ̃	kə̀nénemą	'cradle'
ɬ	ˌɬìˈwēnæ	łȉwéna	'woman, wife'	ˌɬūɬiˈʔīnæ	łùłi’ína	'old man'
l	ˌlīˈlūnæ	lìlúna	'chicken'	ˌkɑ̄ˈlēnæ	kòléna	'wolf'
s	ˈsɤ̄ɑ̄nenæ	sə́onena	'man, husband'	ˌmẽ̄sɑtuˈʔūnæ	mę̀sotu’úna	'church'
tʃ	ˌtʃūlɑˈʔɑ̄næ	cùlo’óna	'dog'	ˌpʼɑ̀ˈtʃīǣne	p’ȍcíane	'ice'
tʃʼ	ˈtʃʼɑ̄ne	c’óne	'liver'	ˌmæ̃̀ˈtʃʼēlenæ	mą̏c’élena	'fingernail'
j	ˈjũ̄næ	yų́na	'this'	ˌkǣˈjūnæ	kàyúna	'maternal aunt'
ɡ	ɡɑsuˈlīnene	gosulínene	'gasoline'	ˈhīʔæ̃nɡæ̃	hí’ąngą	'why, because'
k	ˈkǣnæ	kána	'mother'	ˌtʃībiˈkīnæ	cìbi’kína	'robin'
kʼ	ˈkʼɤ̄ɑ̄nemæ̃	k’ə́onemą	'neck'	ˌpʼɑ̀ˈkʼūɑ̄wɑnæ̃	p’ȍk’úowoną	'fir, spruce'
x	ˈxɑ̄nemæ̃	xónemą	'arm'	ˌɬɑ̄ˈxɑ̄jnæ	łòxóyna	'lip'
kʷ	ˈkʷɑ̄næ	kwóna	'axe'	ˌɬɑ̃̄jˌkʷīǣˈwǣlmæ̃	łǫ̀kwìawálmą	'he was stronger'
kʷʼ	ˌkʷʼǣˈjǣnæ	kw’àyána	'magpie'	ˌpʼɑ̀tukʷʼiˈlɑ̄næ	p’ȍtukw’ilóna	'mint'
xʷ	ˈxʷīlenæ	xwílena	'bow'	ˌtūˈxʷǣnæ	tùxwána	'fox'
w	ˈwǽmæ̃	wa̋mą	'be, have'	ˌɬɑ̄wæˈtūnæ̃	łòwatúną	'chief's cane'
ʔ	ˈʔīǣɬɑnæ	íałona	'willow'	ˌpʼɑ̀ˈʔɑ̃̄jɑnæ	p’ȍ’ǫ́yona	'spider'
h	ˈhɑ̃̄lumæ	hǫ́luma	'lung'	ˌpūɑ̄ˈhɑ̄næ	pùohóna	'ball'

==== Consonant phonetics and allophony ====
- Voiceless stops /p, t, tʃ, k, ʔ/ are very slightly aspirated.
- Aspirated stops /pʰ, tʰ/ are strongly aspirated.
- The ejectives /pʼ, tʼ, tʃʼ, kʼ/ are weakly glottalized.
- The dental consonants /t, d, n, l, ɬ/ are phonetically denti-alveolar.
- In some speakers, /pʰ/ may have an assimilated bilabial fricative [ɸ]: [pɸ]. This can also vary with a deleted stop closure. Thus, /pʰ/ has the following free variation: [ph~pɸ~ɸ]. Examples:

/ˌpʰìˈwēnæ/	('daughter')	>	[ˌphìˑˈwɛ̈̄ːnǣ ~ ˌpɸìˑˈwɛ̈̄ːnǣ ~ ˌɸìˑˈwɛ̈̄ːnǣ]
/ˌpʰɑ̀ˌxʷīliˈʔīnæ/	('glass')	>	[ˌphɒ̀ˑˌxʷīˑlɪ̄ˈʔīːnǣ ~ ˌpɸɒ̀ˑˌxʷīˑlɪ̄ˈʔīːnǣ ~ ˌɸɒ̀ˑˌxʷīˑlɪ̄ˈʔīːnǣ]

- The fricative /f/ only occurs in Spanish loanwords in a syllable-initial cluster /fɾ/ and may be labio-dental or bilabial [ɸ]: /ˈfɾūtɑnæ/ ('fruit' from fruta) as [ˈfɾūːtɑ̄nǣ ~ ˈɸɾūːtɑ̄nǣ]. It is briefly mentioned in Trager (1946) and ultimately excluded from the phonological description.
- The stops /b, d, ɡ/ are voiced [b, d, ɡ] intervocalically. At the beginning of words, they only occur in loanwords (as in /ˈbɑ̄sunæ/ 'glass tumbler' from vaso and /ɡɑjuˈʔūnæ/ 'rooster' from gallo) where Trager describes them as "less voiced". Syllable-finally, they are voiceless, have no audible release, and have a long closure duration [pː̚, tː̚, kː̚]:

[ˈhɑ̄d]	('and')	>	[ˈhɑ̄ːtː̚]

- There is a neutralization of the contrast between the labialized consonants /kʷ, kʷʼ, xʷ/ and their non-labial counterparts /k, kʼ, x/ before the (labial) high back vowels /u, ũ/ where only phonetically labialized velars occur. In this environment, Trager assumes these are non-labials which are phonetically labialized due to assimilation (e.g. /ku/ is [kʷu], /kʼu/ is [kʷʼu], etc.):

/ˌkūjˈlūlunæ/	('skunk')	>	[ˌkʷūˑi̯ˈlōːlōnǣ]
/ˈkʼūɑ̄næ/	('sheep')	>	[ˈkʷʼūɒ̄nǣ]
/huˈxu/	('and then')	>	[hʊ̄ˈxʷūː]

- Fricative /x/ has weak frication, unlike the stronger frication found in other languages (such as, the closely related Picuris language).
- Voiceless /tʃ/ is phonetically an affricate and usually post-alveolar [tʃ]. Taos /tʃ/ is somewhat more palatal than English /tʃ/. However, /tʃ/ can freely vary with a more forward articulation ranging from post-alveolar to alveolar: [tʃ ~ ts]. Some speakers tend to have more forward articulations [ts] before the vowels /e, ɑ/ while ejective /tʃʼ/ is [tʃʼ] before high vowels /i, u/ and [tsʼ] elsewhere although there is some amount of free variation between these realizations. Examples:

/ˈtʃẽ̄læ̃/	('he caught')	>	[ˈtsæ̃̄ːlã̄]
/ˈtʃɑ̃̃lwi/	('blue, green')	>	[ˈtsɔ̃̄ɫwɪ̄]
/ˌtʃīˈjūnæ/	('mouse')	>	[ˌtʃīˑˈjōːnǣ]
/ˈtʃùdena/	('shirt')	>	[ˈtʃùːdɛ̄nǣ]
/ˌtʃæ̃̄pieˈnēnæ/	('yeast')	>	[ˌtʃã̄ˑpīɛ̯̄ˈnɛ̄ːnǣ]
/ˌtʃʼīˈpǣnæ/	('doll')	>	[ˌtʃʼīˑˈpǣːnǣ]
/ˌtʃʼùˈnēnæ/	('coyote')	>	[ˌtʃʼòˑˈnɛ̄ːnǣ]
/ˈtʃʼẽ́mæmæ̃/	('be new')	>	[ˈtsʼæ̃́mǣmã̄]
/ˌtʃʼɑ̄wɑwɑˈʔɑ̄næ/	('ankle')	>	[ˌtsʼɑ̄ˑwɒ̄wɒ̄ˈʔɑ̄ːnǣ]
/ˌtʃʼæ̀ˈwēnæ/	('bluejay')	>	[ˌtsʼæ̀ˑˈwɛ̄ːnǣ]

- Fricative /s/ tends to have a post-alveolar allophone before high vowels /i, u/ (especially the high front vowel /i/):

/ˌkɑ̄siˈʔīnæ/	('cow')	>	[ˌkɑ̄ˑʃɪ̄ˈʔīːnǣ]
/ˌsùˈlēnæ/	('bluebird')	>	[ˌʃòˑˈlɛ̄ːnǣ]

- The flap /ɾ/ is a borrowed phoneme (< Spanish [ɾ]) that occurs in loanwords from New Mexican Spanish that were borrowed relatively recently as in

/ˌɾǣntʃuˈʔūnæ/	('ranch')	(from rancho)
/ˌpēɾɑˈʔɑ̄næ/	('pear')	(from pera)
/biˌnɑ̃̄ɡɾeˈʔēne/	('vinegar')	(from vinagre)

- The lateral liquid /l/ is velarized [ɫ] at the end of syllables:

/ˌkīǣˈwǣlmæ̃/	('be strong')	>	[ˌkīǣˈwǣɫmã̄]

- The labial glide /w/ is labio-velar.
- The glides /w, j/ are phonetically short high vowels [u̯, i̯] no closer than Taos high vowels, which are very close as well. When they occur after nasal vowels, they are nasalized: [ũ̯, ĩ̯].

==== Consonant alternations ====
The stem-initial consonant in many verb stems has alternates (i.e. shows consonantal ablaut) between two different forms in what Trager calls the "basic" stem and the "stative" stem. The "basic" stem is used for the preterit active verb form while the "stative" stem is used for the resultative stative verb-forms and deverbal nouns.

Basic Initial	Stative Initial	Example
pʼ	p	/ˈpʼɤ̄ɑ̄dæ̃/ ('he lost it') /ˈpɤ̄ɑ̄dæ/ ('it is lost')
tʼ	t	/ˈtʼæ̃̄mæ̃/ ('he helped him') /ˈtæ̃̄mmæ̃/ ('he was helped')
tʃʼ	tʃ	/ˈtʃʼī/ ('he tied it') /ˈtʃī/ ('it is tied')
kʼ	k	/ˈkʼɑ̄læ̃/ ('he ate it') /ˈkɑ̄llæ/ ('it was eaten')
ʔ	k	/ˈʔæ̃̄mæ̃/ ('he did') /ˈkæ̃̄mmæ̃/ ('it is done')
h	x	/ˈhɑ̄j/ ('he took it') /ˈxɑ̄jmæ̃/ ('it has been taken')
m	p	/ˈmɑ̃̀/ ('he brought it') /næ̃ˈpɑ̃̀mæ̃/ ('it has been brought')
w	kʷ	/ˈwɑ̄næ̃/ ('he arrived') /ˌkʷɑ̄ˈnēne/ ('arrival')
w	xʷ	/ˈwɤ̄jæ̃/ ('he took it off') /ˈxʷɤ̄jmæ̃/ ('it has been taken off')
j	tʃ	/ˈjīǣ/ ('he walked') /ˌtʃīǣˈʔǣne/ ('walk' [noun])

A different set of alternations are what Trager calls "internal" ablaut. The last consonant of the verb stem alternates between two different consonants in the basic stem form and the negative stem form.

Basic Consonant	Negative Consonant	Example
b	p	/ˈʔĩ̀ẽ̀siabæ̃/ ('he kicked') /ˌwɑ̀ˈʔĩ̀ẽ̀siapi/ ('he didn't kick')
d	t	/ˈpʼɤ̄ɑ̄dæ̃/ ('he lost it') /ˌwɑ̀ˈpɤ̄ɑ̄ti/ ('he didn't lose it')
j	tʃ	/ˈhɑ̃̄j/ ('he accepted') /ˌwɑ̀ˈhɑ̃̄tʃi/ ('he didn't accept')
j	k	/ˈɬɑ̃̄j/ ('he sat down') /ˌwɑ̀ˈɬɑ̃̄ki/ ('he didn't sit down')
m	p	/ˈmæ̃̀tʼemæ̃/ ('he hit') /ˌwɑ̀ˌmæ̃̀ˈtʼēpi/ ('he didn't hit')
n	t	/ˈxʷɑ̃̄næ̃/ ('he beat') /ˌwɑ̀ˈxʷɑ̃̄ti/ ('he didn't beat')

=== Vowels ===
==== Monophthongs ====
Taos has six vowels with three contrastive vowel heights and two degrees of vowel backness.

Phonemic vowels
	Front		Back	
	oral	nasal	oral	nasal
Close	i	ĩ	u	ũ
Mid	e	ẽ	ɤ	
Open	æ	æ̃	ɑ	ɑ̃

Five of the vowels have an oral-nasal contrast, which persists even before a nasal consonant coda (i.e. the syllables CVN and CṼN contrast, where C = any consonant, V = any vowel, N = any nasal consonant). For example, the Taos has a /ju/ syllable before /n/ as well as /jũ/ syllable before /n/ as in the words /ˌkæˈjūnæ/ ('maternal aunt') and /ˈjũ̄næ/ ('this').

Morphemes exemplifying Taos monophthongs are in the table below:

Vowel	IPA	Gloss	Vowel	IPA	Gloss
i	ˈhīli	'what'	u	ˈʔūtʃu	'he met'
ĩ	ˈwĩ̄nẽ	'he stopped'	ũ	ˈpʼũ̄	'who'
e	-ne	(duoplural noun suffix)	ɤ	ˈtʃɤ̄	'hunt' (verb)
ẽ	ˈʔẽ́	'you'			
æ	ˈpǣ	'he made'	ɑ	ˈtʼɑ́	'he danced'
æ̃	hæ̃	'yes'	ɑ̃	ˈwɑ̃̄	'blow'

===== Monophthong phonetics and allophony =====
- Vowels /i, u/ have lowered variants [ɪ, ʊ] in closed syllables and when unstressed. The /i/ in closed syllables is somewhat lower than the /i/ in unstressed syllables.

/ˈkʷīnmæ̃/	('to stand')	>	[ˈkʷɪ̄nmã̄]	(closed syllable)
/ˈhũ̄ɬɑlinæ̃/	('weapon')	>	[ˈhũ̄ːɬɑ̄lɪ̄nã̄]	(unstressed)
/ʔæ̃ˌtʃudˈʔuɑnbɑ/	('his-garment-around')	>	[ʔãˌtʃʊt̚ːˈʔuɞnbɑ]	(closed syllable)
/ˈʔĩ̀ẽ̀tʰunæ̃/	('ladder')	>	[ˈʔĩ̀æ̃̀tʰʊ̄nã̄]	(unstressed)

- The vowel /u/ has phonetic "inner rounding". The vowel /u/ has a variant [o] with very narrow lip rounding before /l, m, n/:

/ɬuˈlēne/	('rain')	>	[ɬōˈlɛ̄ːnɛ]
/ˈxũ̄mmæ̃/	('to love' [reflexive possessive])	>	[ˈxōmmã̄]
/ˈpʰǣɬunẽ/	('it was being burned')	>	[ˈpʰǣːɬonæ̃]

- The mid vowels /e, ɤ/ may be phonetically somewhat centralized. Front /e/ is typically slightly centered [ɛ̈] in both stressed and unstressed syllables. Back /ɤ/ ranges from back to central [ɤ ~ ɘ] and is [ɘ] when unstressed. Although both are mid, /ɤ/ (upper-mid) is phonetically higher than /e/ which is phonetically lower-mid [ɛ]. In contrast to the high back vowel /u/, mid /ɤ/ is unrounded. Unlike the other vowels, /ɤ/ has no nasal counterpart. Examples:

/ˌtʃīˈwēnemæ̃/	('eagles')	>	[ˌtʃīˑˈwɛ̈̄ːnɛ̈̄mã]
/ˌmæ̃̀ˈpɤ̄wmæ̃/	('it was squeezed')	>	[ˌmã̀ˑˈpɤ̄u̯mã̄ ~ ˌmã̀ˑˈpɘ̄u̯mã̄]
/ˌpʼɑ̀xɤˈɬɑ̄næ/	('star')	>	[ˌpʼɒ̀ˑxɘ̄ˈɬɑ̄ːnæ]

- The oral mid-front vowel /e/ predominantly occurs in suffixes while nasalized /ẽ/ is relatively common in stems. Nasalized /ẽ/ is phonetically lower than its oral counterpart: [ɛ̞̃ ~ æ̃]:

/ˌtẽ̄ˈʔēne/	('act of cutting')	>	[ˌtæ̃̄ˑˈʔɛ̄ːnɛ̄]

- Oral /æ/ is phonetically front and is uncommon in syllables with primary stress. Nasalized /æ̃/ is phonetically a central vowel [ã]; it is lower than and not as far back as /ɑ̃/. Before a /m, n/ coda, /æ̃/ is very similar to the centralized /ɑ/ before syllable-final /m, n/ both of which are similar to the [ʌ] of English. Examples:

/ˈtʼǣhɑ̃ne/	('he won')	>	[ˈtʼǣːhɔ̃nɛ]
/ˌnæ̃̄ˈmēne/	('soil')	>	[ˌnã̄ˑˈmɛ̄ːnɛ̄]
/ʔæ̃mˈpūjˌwæ̀ʔinæ̃/	('his friends')	>	[ʔɜ̃̄mˈpʊ̄i̯ˌwæ̀ˑʔɪ̄nã̄]
/ʔæ̃nnæ̃ˌtʰɤˈwǽʔi/	('my house')	>	[ʔɜ̃̄nnã̄ˌtʰɤ̄ˑˈwǽːʔɪ̄]

- The vowel /ɑ/ has a slightly rounded variant [ɒ̜] after labials /p, pʰ, pʼ, b, m, w/ and also before /p, pʰ, pʼ, b, m/ and syllable-final /w/. Before syllable-final nasals /m, n/ and the glide /j/, this vowel is centralized: [ɜ] (before /n, j/), [ɞ̜] (before /m/). Nasalized /ɑ̃/ is phonetically slightly rounded and higher than its oral counterpart: [ɔ̜̃]. Examples:

/ˈpɑ̄næ/	('pumpkin')	>	[ˈpɒ̜̄ːnǣ]
/ˌpʰɑ̄ˈʔīnæ/	('peach')	>	[ˌpʰɒ̜̄ˑˈʔīːnǣ]
/ˈkɤ̄wbɑ/	('long time ago')	>	[ˈkɤ̄u̯bɒ̜̄]
/mɑˈʔĩ̄ẽ̄lũ/	('he ran')	>	[mɒ̜̄ˈʔĩ̄æ̃̄lʊ̃]
/ˈjūwɑlænæ̃/	('skirt')	>	[ˈjūːwɒ̜̄lǣnã̄]
/mɑˌwɑ̀ˈɬɑ̄pi/	('he didn't urinate')	>	[mɒ̜̄ˌwɒ̜̀ˑˈɬɒ̜̄ːpɪ̄]
/kɑˈpʰǣne/	('coffee')	>	[kɒ̜̄ˈpʰǣːnɛ̄]
/ˌtɑ̄ˈbūnæ/	('governor of pueblo')	>	[ˌtɒ̜̄ˑˈbūːnǣ]
/ʔɑˈmũ̀jæ/	('he sees me')	>	[ʔɒ̜̄ˈmũ̀ːjǣ]
/ˌkɑ̄wˌʔùˈʔūnæ/	('colt')	>	[ˌkɒ̜̄u̯ˌʔùˑˈʔūːnǣ]
/ˌkɑ̄mpuˈʔūnæ/	('camp" (noun)	>	[ˌkɞ̜̄mpʊ̄ˈʔūːnǣ]
/ˈtʼɑ̄jnæ/	('person')	>	[ˈtʼɜ̄i̯nǣ]
/ˈtʰɑ̃̀/	('he found')	>	[ˈtʰɔ̃̀]

The allophonic variation of the vowels detailed above are summarized in the following chart:

Phonetic vowels
	Front	Central	Back
Close	[i] = /i/ [ĩ] = /ĩ/		[u] = /u/ [ũ] = /ũ/
Near-close	[ɪ] = /i/ [ɪ̃] = /ĩ/		[ʊ] = /u/ [ʊ̃] = /ũ/
Close-mid		[ɘ] = /ɤ/	[ɤ] = /ɤ/ [o] = /u/
Open-mid	[ɛ̈, ɛ] = /e/	[ɜ̃] = /æ̃/ [ɜ, ɞ] = /ɑ/	[ɔ̃] = /ɑ̃/
Open	[æ] = /æ/ [æ̃] = /ẽ/	[ã] = /æ̃/	[ɑ, ɒ] = /ɑ/

- Vowel length allophony:
  1. The duration of vowels varies according to stress. Vowels in syllables with primary stress are relatively long and somewhat shorter in syllables with secondary stress. Unstressed syllables have short vowels. For example, the word /ˌɬɑ̄ˈtʰɤ̄næ/ ('boat') is [ˌɬɑ̄ˑˈtʰɤ̄ːnǣ] with the primary-stressed syllable [tʰɤ̄ː] having a long vowel, the secondary-stressed syllable [ɬɑ̄ˑ] having a less long vowel and the unstressed [nǣ] having a short vowel.
  2. The presence of a consonant coda also affects vowel length. Vowels are short in closed syllables (but not as short as unstressed syllables) and long in open syllables.
  3. There is also an interaction between tone and vowel length. Vowels with a mid tone are long while with a low tone are "pulsated". Trager mentions further interaction but does not report the details.

==== Diphthongs ====
In addition to these monophthongs, Taos has five (native) vowel clusters (i.e. diphthongs) that can function as syllable nuclei and are approximately the same duration as the single vowels:

/ie, iæ, ĩẽ, uɑ, ɤɑ/

Unlike diphthongs in several other languages, each component of the vowel cluster has an equal prominence and duration (i.e. there are no offglides or onglides). The cluster /ie/ is rare in general; the clusters /iæ, uɑ/ are uncommon in unstressed syllables. Additionally, the vowel cluster

/ue/

is found in less-assimilated Spanish loanwords. Examples of the clusters are below:

Cluster	IPA	Gloss
ie	-mæ̃ˈsīēnæ ˌpʰìwmæ̃ˈsīēnæ	'step-relation' (suffix) 'step-daughter'
iæ	ˌkʷīǣˈwīne	'race'
ĩẽ	ˌʔĩ̄ẽ̄mẽˈʔēnæ	'paternal aunt'
uɑ	ʔiˌwɑ̀ˈwɑ̃̄puɑ	'the wind did not blow'
ɤɑ	ˈtʰɤ̄ɑ̄hu	'he is gathering it'
ue	ˌpūēlɑˈʔɑ̄ne	'frying pans'

The phonetics of the vowel clusters vary in their length and also their quality according to stress, tone, and position syllable structure. The clusters /ie, iæ, uɑ/ have vowel components of equal length in stressed closed syllables (either primary or medial stress) with mid tone. However, in unstressed syllables and in low-toned syllables (with either primary or medial stress) the first vowel in the cluster is more prominent; in high-toned syllables and in open syllables with primary stress and mid tone, the second vowel is more prominent. The nasal cluster /ĩẽ/ has equally prominent vowels in primary-stressed mid-toned syllables while in closed syllables and unstressed the second vowel is extremely short. The cluster /ɤɑ/ always has the first element more prominent than the second vowel.

For the quality differences, the vowel /ɑ/ in cluster /ɤɑ/ is raised toward [ɜ]. When short, the vowel /e/ in cluster /ĩẽ/ is raised toward [ɪ]. The vowel /ɑ/ in cluster /uɑ/ is rounded to [ɒ] and is more rounded than the [ɒ̜] allophone of monophthong /ɑ/ adjacent to labials. These allophones are summarized in the table below:

Cluster	Allophone	Environment
/ie/	iɛ	stressed & mid tone & closed
/ie/	iɛ̯	low tone or unstressed
/ie/	jɛ	high tone or primary stress & mid tone & open
/iæ/	iæ	stressed & mid tone
/iæ/	iæ̯	low tone or unstressed
/iæ/	jæ	high tone or primary stress & mid tone & open
/ĩẽ/	ĩæ̃	primary stress
/ĩẽ/	ĩɪ̯̃	closed or unstressed
/uɑ/	uɒ	stressed & mid tone
/uɑ/	uɒ̯	low tone or unstressed
/uɑ/	wɒ	high tone or primary stress & mid tone & open
/ɤɑ/	ɘɞ̯	all environments

The monophthongs can be followed by high front and high back offglides, but these are analyzed as glide consonants in a coda position. Trager notes that in these sequences the glides are not as prominent as the vowel nuclei but that the difference is not very marked, and, in fact, Harrington (1910) describes these as diphthongs on par with Trager's "vowel clusters". The following vowel + glide sequences are reported in Trager (1946):

Vowel nucleus	/j/ offglide	/w/ offglide	Vowel nucleus	/j/ offglide	/w/ offglide
/i/	–	iw	/u/	uj	–
/ĩ/	–	ĩw	/ũ/	ũj	–
/e/	–	–	/ɤ/	ɤj	ɤw
/ẽ/	ẽj	–			
/æ/	æj	æw	/ɑ/	ɑj	ɑw
/æ̃/	æ̃j	æ̃w	/ɑ̃/	ɑ̃j	–

==== Reduplicative patterning ====
Noun stems that end in a vowel have a suffixation-reduplication process in absolute forms that attaches a glottal stop /ʔ/ and a reduplicant consisting of a reduplicated stem-final vowel to the noun stem (which is, then, followed by an inflectional suffix):

STEM- + -ʔV- + -SUFFIX (where V = a reduplicated vowel)

If the stem-final vowel is an oral vowel, the reduplicated vowel is exactly the same as the stem vowel:

/ˌkʷẽ̄ˌxɑ̄tʃiˈʔīnæ/	('bracelet')	(< kʷẽxɑtʃi- + -ʔi- + -næ)
/ˌtʃīwjuˈʔūnæ/	('bird')	(< tʃiwju- + -ʔu- + -næ)
/ˌkēkeˈʔēnæ/	('cake')	(< keke- + -ʔe- + -næ)
/ˌpɤ̀ˈʔɤ̄næ/	('fish')	(< pɤ- + -ʔɤ- + -næ)
/ˌjūwɑlæˈʔǣne/	('skirts')	(< juwɑlæ- + -ʔæ- + -ne)
/ˌtʃīlijɑˈʔɑ̄næ/	('bat')	(< tʃilijɑ- + -ʔɑ- + -næ)

However, if the stem-final vowel is nasal, the nasality is not copied in the reduplicant — that is, the nasal vowel will be reduplicated as that vowel's oral counterpart:

/ˌpɑ̃̄ˈʔɑ̄ne/	('earth" (duoplural)	(< pɑ̃- + -ʔɑ- + -ne)
/ˌtʃīǣkɑ̃ˈʔɑ̄næ/	('question')	(< tʃiækɑ̃- + -ʔɑ- + -næ)
/ˌʔùɬẽɬẽˈʔēnæ/	('youth')	(< ʔuɬẽɬẽ- + -ʔe- + -næ)

In stems that end in a vowel cluster, only the second vowel of the cluster is reduplicated:

/ˌʔìæ̀ˈʔǣne/	('corn (duoplural)')	(< ʔiæ- + -ʔæ- + -ne)

And a nasal cluster has a reduplicated and denasalized second vowel:

/ˌpĩ̄ẽ̄ˈʔēnæ/	('bed')	(< pĩẽ- + -ʔe- + -næ)

==== Vowel deletion ====
Taos shares with other languages in the region (Pueblo linguistic area) an areal feature of vowel elision at the end of words. When a word ends in a final vowel, the vowel may be deleted resulting in a consonant final word. This is especially common with final /æ̃/ and occasionally with final /u/. The elision is also very common when the final /æ̃/ is preceded by a sonorant consonant such as /l, n/, etc.

For example, the 3rd person pronoun particle

/ˈʔæ̃̄wæ̃næ̃/ ('he, she, it, they')

is often phonetically

[ˈʔã̄ːwã̄n]

with syllable reduction and a resulting closed syllable. Other examples include

/ˈsíénæ̃/	('hundred')	>	[ˈsí̯ɛ́n]
/ˈmīlæ̃/	('thousand')	>	[ˈmɪ̃ɫ]
/ˈhɑ̄dæ̃/	('and')	>	[ˈhɑ̄ːt̚ː]
/ˈhīʔæ̃nɡæ̃/	('why, because')	>	[ˈhīːʔãŋk̚ː]

In the words /ˈhɑ̄dæ̃, ˈhīʔæ̃nɡæ̃/, the voiced stops become phonetically voiceless, unreleased, and have long durations when word-final in addition to the loss of the final vowel.

Vowel elision is common in connected speech. Trager (1946) notes that the elision may affect stress patterns but that this requires further research. Trager (1944) states that the deletion of final /æ̃/ after a sonorant and the retention of /æ̃/ is in free variation but may be related to speaking speed and syntax although the details are still unknown.

== Prosody ==
=== Stress ===
Trager analyzes Taos as having three degrees of stress:

- primary
- secondary
- unstressed

Trager describes Taos stress in terms of loudness; however, he also notes in several places where stress has effects on vowel length and vowel quality.

All words must have a single primary stress. Polysyllabic words can, in addition to the syllable with primary stress, have syllables with secondary stress, unstressed syllables, or a combination of both unstressed and secondarily-stressed syllables.

Trager (1946) states that the primary and secondary stress levels are in complementary distribution in low-toned and high-toned syllables. However, his later analysis rejects this.

When two morphemes both with a primary stress in each morpheme are concatenated together, the first primary stress in the leftmost morpheme becomes a secondary stress (while the rightmost morpheme retains the primary stress).

=== Tone ===
Taos has three tones:

- high (symbol: acute accent ´)
- mid (symbol: macron ¯)
- low (symbol: grave accent `)

The tonal system is however marginal. Trager describes the tones as being distinguished by pitch differences. The mid tone is by the most commonly occurring tone; high tone is limited to a few stems and suffixes; the low tone is relatively common in stem syllables. The high tone is described as "higher and sharper" than the mid tone while the low tone is "distinctly lower and drawling". Many words are distinguished solely by tonal differences as in the following minimal pairs which demonstrate the contrast between the mid tone and the low tone in stressed syllables:

/ˈtʃũ̄/	('pass by')	/ˈwẽ̄mæ̃/	('one')
/ˈtʃũ̀/	('suck')	/ˈwẽ̀mæ̃/	('it is real')

There is no tonal contrast in unstressed syllables, which have only phonetic mid tones. Thus, the word /ˌpūluˈlūnæ/ ('plum') has the unstressed syllables /lu/ and /næ/ which have phonetic mid tones resulting in a phonetic form of [ˌpōˑlōˈlōːnǣ].

Trager (1946) initially found the stress level to be predictable in syllables with high and low tones; however, Trager (1948) finds this to be in error with the addition of newly collected data and a different theoretical outlook. (See stress section above.)

In his final historical notes, Trager (1946) suggests that in proto-Taos (or in proto-Tiwa) there may originally have been only a stress system and a contrast of vowel length which later developed into the present tonal-stress system and lost the vowel length contrasts.

=== Syllables and phonotactics ===
The simplest syllable in Taos consists of a single consonant in the onset (i.e. beginning consonant) followed by a single vowel nucleus, i.e. a CV syllable. An onset and nucleus are obligatory in every syllable. Complex onsets consisting of a two-consonant cluster (CC) are found only in loanwords borrowed from New Mexican Spanish. The nucleus can have optionally two vowels in vowel clusters (V or VV). The syllable coda (i.e. the final consonants) is optional and can consist of up to two consonants (C or CC). In other words, the following are possible syllable types in Taos: CV, CVV, CVC, CVVC, CVCC (and in loanwords also: CCV, CCVV, CCVC, CCVVC, CCVCC, CCVVCC). This can be succinctly represented in the following (where optional segments are enclosed in parentheses):

C1 (C2)V1(V_{2})(C3)(C4<) + Tone

Additionally, every syllable has a tone associated with it. The number of possible syllables occurring in Taos is greatly limited by a number of phonotactic constraints.

A further point concerns Trager's analysis of Taos coda syllables: CC clusters occurring in codas are only possible as a result of vowel elision, which is often apocope. For example, /ˈhīʔæ̃nɡæ̃/ ('why') has a CV.CVC.CV syllable structure, but after the elision of the final /æ̃/ the resulting /ˈhīʔæ̃nɡ/ has a CV.CVCC structure with a CC cluster in the coda of the last syllable.

==== Onsets ====
A single onset C1 can be filled by any Taos consonant (except the borrowed /f/) — that is, /p, pʼ, pʰ, b, m, w, t, tʼ, tʰ, d, n, l, ɬ, tʃ, tʃʼ, s, ɾ, j, k, kʼ, kʷ, kʷʼ, ɡ, x, xʷ, ʔ, h/ are possible onsets. The onset /ɾ/, and the onsets /b, d, ɡ/ word-initially, are only found in Spanish borrowings. In a loanword two-consonant C1C<2 cluster, C can be filled only by voiceless stops /p, t, k, f/ while C2 can be filled only by /ɾ, l/ in the following combinations:

	C2	
C1	ɾ	l
p	pɾ	pl
t	tɾ	–
k	kɾ	kl

Of the onsets, /p, pʼ, pʰ, t, tʼ, tʰ, tʃ, tʃʼ, k, kʼ, kʷ, kʷʼ, ʔ, ɬ, x, xʷ, h, pɾ, pl, tɾ, kɾ, kl, fɾ/ can only occur as onsets (and not as codas).

==== Rimes ====
Within the syllable rime, any single Taos vowel — /i, ĩ, e, ẽ, æ, æ̃, ɑ, ɑ̃, ɤ, u, ũ/ — may occur in the nucleus. In complex nuclei consisting of vowel clusters, the following combinations are possible:

Vowel nucleus clusters
	Final component			
Initial component	e	ẽ	æ	ɑ
i	ie	–	iæ	–
ĩ	–	ĩẽ	–	–
u	ue^{†}	–	–	uɑ
ɤ	–	–	–	ɤɑ

† - only in loanwords

The /ue/ cluster was found only in a single word /ˈpūēlɑnæ̃/ ('frying pan' from hypothetical Spanish *puela probably from French poêle).

A subset of Taos consonants consisting of voiced stops and sonorants — /b, d, ɡ, m, n, l, ɾ, w, j/ — can occur in coda C_{4} position. There is a restriction that high vowels cannot be followed by a homorganic glide (i.e., /ij, uw/ do not occur). Not all VC combinations are attested. The attested sequences of V + glide are listed in the vowel diphthong section above. Additionally, /s/ may appear in coda position in loanwords.

In complex two-consonant C_{3}C_{4} codas, Trager (1946) states that the final consonant C_{4} can consist of a voiced stop /b, d, ɡ/ and be preceded by a consonant C_{3} consisting of a non-liquid sonorant /m, n, w, j/. However, Trager (1948) states that the following are the only attested coda clusters:

/nɡ, lɡ, jɡ/

Trager does not discuss the combinatory possibilities between segments and tones, although he does for stress and tone.

== Loanword phonology ==
Trager (1944) indicates the type of phonetic/phonological changes that New Mexican Spanish loanwords undergo when being adapted to the Taos language. Different degrees of nativization occur in Spanish loanwords: earlier borrowings have greater differences while later borrowings (borrowed by speakers who are probably increasingly bilingual) have much greater similarity with the Spanish forms. The chart below lists some of the correspondences. The inflected nouns in the table are in the absolute singular form with the inflectional suffix and any reduplicant separated from the initial noun stem with hyphens.

New Mexican Spanish phoneme(s)	Taos phoneme(s)	Example		
New Mexican Spanish phoneme(s)	Taos phoneme(s)	Taos		Spanish
New Mexican Spanish phoneme(s)	Taos phoneme(s)	word	gloss	Spanish
/b/ [b] (initial)	/m/	ˌmūlsɑ‑ˈʔɑ̄‑næ	'pocket'	< bolsa
/b/ [β] (intervocalic)	/b/	ˈxʷǣbæsi	'Thursday'	< jueves
/d/ [d] (initial)	/t/	tuˈmĩ̄ku	'week'	< domingo
/d/ [ð] (intervocalic)	/l/	ˈsɑ̄bɑlu	'Saturday'	< sábado
/d/ [ð] (intervocalic)	/d/ (after Taos /l/)	telẽˈdūne‑nemæ̃	'fork'	< tenedor
/dɾ/ [ðɾ]	/jl/	kuˌmǣjli‑ˈʔī‑næ	'one's child's godmother'	< comadre
/f/	/pʰ/	ˌpʰīstul‑ˈe‑ne	'pin'	< fistol
/x/ [h]	/h/ (initial)	ˈhǣlɡɑ‑næ̃	'rug'	< jerga
/x/ [h]	/x/ (intervocalic)	ˈmīlxinæ̃	'the mother Virgin'	< virgen
/xu/ + V ([hw] + V)	/xʷ/ + V	ˈxʷǣbæsi	'Thursday'	< jueves
/nd/ [nd]	/n/	suˌpɑ̄nɑ‑ˈʔɑ̄‑næ	'bed spring'	< sopanda
V + /nɡ/ [Ṽŋɡ]	/Ṽk/	tuˈmĩ̄ku	'week'	< domingo
/ɲ/	/j/	kæˈjūn‑e‑næ	'canyon'	< cañón
/ɾ/	/l/	ˈlǣj‑næ	'king'	< rey
/r/	/ld/	ˌmūldu‑ˈʔū‑næ	'donkey'	< burro
/i/ [i]	/i/	mɑlˌtīju‑ˈʔū‑næ	'hammer'	< martillo
/i/ [j] (before V)	/j/	ˌjǣwɑ‑ˈʔɑ̄‑næ	'mare'	< yegua
/ie/ [je]	/iæ/	ˈmīǣlnæ̃si	'Friday'	< viernes
/u/ [u]	/u/	ˈlūnæ̃si	'Monday'	< lunes
/u/ [w] (before V)	/w/	ˌjǣwɑ‑ˈʔɑ̄‑næ	'mare'	< yegua
/e/ [ɛ] (stressed)	/æ/	ˌwǣltɑ‑ˈʔɑ̄‑ne	'garden'	< huerta
/e/ [e] (unstressed)	/i/	ˈmīǣlkulisi	'Wednesday'	< miércoles
/o/	/u/	ˌtūlu‑ˈʔū‑næ	'bull'	< toro
/a/ [ɑ]	/ɑ/	ˌmūlsɑ‑ˈʔɑ̄‑næ	'pocket'	< bolsa

Although NM Spanish /a/ is usually borrowed as Taos /ɑ/, it is nativized as /æ/ when it precedes the Taos glide /j/, which is the nativization of NM Spanish /d/ in the cluster /dɾ/ (/dɾ/ > Taos /jl/). Because Taos /ɑ/ when followed by /j/ is typically raised (i.e. /ɑj/ is phonetically [ɜi̯]), Taos /æ/ is phonetically a closer match to NM Spanish low /a/. Thus, NM Spanish compadre is borrowed as /kumˌpǣjli‑ˈʔī‑næ/ ('one's child's godfather' absolute) (with /adɾ/ [ɑðɾ] > /æjl/).

Taos /æ/ is a better match than /e/ for NM Spanish /e/ (phonetically [ɛ]) because Taos /e/ is restricted to affixes in native Taos words.

Another common process is the insertion of /i/ after in New Mexican Spanish words ending in /s/, as native words in Taos cannot have syllables ending in /s/.

The other NM Spanish phonemes are nativized as similar phonemes in Taos: NM Spanish /p/ > Taos /p/, NM Spanish /t/ > Taos /t/, NM Spanish /ɡ/ > Taos /ɡ/ (but see above for NM Spanish sequence /nɡ/), NM Spanish /tʃ/ > Taos /tʃ/, NM Spanish /s/ > Taos /s/, NM Spanish /m/ > Taos /m/, NM Spanish /n/ > Taos /n/, NM Spanish /l/ > Taos /l/.

Later borrowing, which has been subject to less alteration, has led to the development of /ɾ/, word‑initial voiced stops /b, d, ɡ/, syllable‑final /s/, and consonants clusters /pl, pɾ, tɾ, kɾ, kl, fɾ/. The word‑internal cluster /stɾ/ is reduced to /st/ in Taos, as in NM Spanish maestro > Taos /ˌmēstu‑ˈʔū‑næ/ ('teacher') — the cluster was reduced further to just /t/ as /ˌmētu‑ˈʔū‑næ/ in one speaker, a reflection of the older pattern where /s/ cannot be syllable‑final.

== See also ==
- Taos language

== Bibliography ==
- Hale, Kenneth L. (1967). "Toward a reconstruction of Kiowa–Tanoan phonology". International Journal of American Linguistics. 33 (2): 112–120. doi:10.1086/464948. JSTOR 1263955. S2CID 145012812.
- Harrington, John P. (1909). "Notes on the Piro language". American Anthropologist. 11 (4): 563–594. doi:10.1525/aa.1909.11.4.02a00030. JSTOR 659848.
- Harrington, John P. (1910). "An introductory paper on the Tiwa language, dialect of Taos". American Anthropologist. 12 (1): 11–48. doi:10.1525/aa.1910.12.1.02a00030. hdl:2027/uc1.l0070881495. JSTOR 659513.
- Lynn, Nichols (1994). "Vowel copy and stress in Northern Tiwa (Picurís and Taos)". Harvard Working Papers in Linguistics. 4: 133–140.
- Trager, George L. (1936). "ðə lɛŋɡwiɟ əv ðə pweblow əv Taos (*nuw meksikow)" [The language of the pueblo of Taos (*New Mexico)]. Le Maître Phonétique. 14 (51), No. 56: 59–62. JSTOR 44704883.
- Trager, George L. (1939). "The days of the week in the language of Taos Pueblo, New Mexico". Language. 15 (1): 51–55. doi:10.2307/409410. JSTOR 409410.
- Trager, George L. (1942). "The historical phonology of the Tiwa languages". Studies in Linguistics. 1 (5): 1–10.
- Trager, George L. (1943). "The kinship and status terms of the Tiwa languages". American Anthropologist. 45 (1): 557–571. doi:10.1525/aa.1943.45.4.02a00060. JSTOR 662736.
- Trager, George L. (1944). "Spanish and English loanwords in Taos". International Journal of American Linguistics. 10 (4): 144–158. doi:10.1086/463836. S2CID 145339152.
- Trager, George L. (1946). "An outline of Taos grammar". In Osgood, Cornelius (ed.). Linguistic structures of Native America. New York: Wenner-Green Foundation for Anthropological Research. pp. 184–221. OCLC 7198204.
- Trager, George L. (July 1948). "Taos I: A language revisited". International Journal of American Linguistics. 14 (3): 155–160. doi:10.1086/463997. JSTOR 1263040. S2CID 144406776.
- Trager, George L.; Valdez, Genevieve (1937). "English loans in Colorado Spanish". American Speech. 12 (1): 34–44. doi:10.2307/451807. JSTOR 451807.
