= Edward T. Hall =

American anthropologist

- Hall in 1966
- Born: Edward Twitchell Hall, Jr. May 16, 1914; Webster Groves, Missouri, United States
- Died: July 20, 2009 (aged 95); Santa Fe, New Mexico, United States
- Education: Columbia University
- Known for: Proxemics, High-context and low-context cultures, monochronic and polychronic time
- Scientific career
- Fields: Anthropology
- Workplaces: United States Army, University of Denver, Bennington College, Harvard Business School, Illinois Institute of Technology, Northwestern University, United States Department of State

Edward Twitchell Hall Jr. (May 16, 1914 – July 20, 2009) was an American anthropologist and cross-cultural researcher. He is remembered for developing the concept of proxemics and exploring cultural and social cohesion, and describing how people behave and react in different types of culturally defined personal space. Hall was an influential colleague of Marshall McLuhan and Buckminster Fuller.

== Biography ==
Hall was born in Webster Groves, Missouri, the son of Purina Mills executive Edward T. Hall and painter Jessie Gilroy Hall. His parents divorced when he was twelve, and his mother married German-born sculptor Heinz Warneke. Hall stayed with his father, and his five-year-old sister Priscilla went with his mother.

Hall taught at the University of Denver, Colorado; Bennington College in Vermont; Harvard Business School; Illinois Institute of Technology; Northwestern University in Illinois and others. The foundation for his lifelong research on cultural perceptions of space was laid during World War II, when he served in the U.S. Army in Europe and the Philippines.

From 1933 through 1937, Hall lived and worked with the Navajo and the Hopi on Native American reservations in northeastern Arizona, the subject of his autobiographical West of the Thirties. He received his Ph.D. from Columbia University in 1942 and continued with field work and direct experience throughout Europe, the Middle East, and Asia. During the 1950s he worked for the United States State Department, at the Foreign Service Institute (FSI), teaching inter-cultural communications skills to foreign service personnel, developed the concepts of high-context and low-context cultures, and wrote several popular practical books on dealing with cross-cultural issues in theory and practice. He is considered a founding father of intercultural communication as an academic area of study.

Throughout his career, Hall introduced a number of new concepts, including proxemics, monochronic time, polychronic time, and high-context and low-context cultures. In his second book, The Hidden Dimension (1966), he describes the culturally specific temporal and spatial dimensions that surround each of us, such as the physical distances people maintain in different contexts.

In The Silent Language (1959), Hall coined the term "polychronic" to describe the ability to attend to multiple events simultaneously, as opposed to "monochronic" individuals and cultures who tend to handle events sequentially.

In the 1960s, Hall published his theory of proxemics, the study of the human use of space, creating a new field of research investigating the nature of personal and public space, and how it may differ between cultures.

In 1976, he released his third book, Beyond Culture, which is notable for having developed the idea of extension transference; by an extension, he simply means any technological item, from clothes to laptops. He brings to our attention the fact that these 'extensions' only help us perform certain functions, but they as extensions will never quite be able to carry out these functions by themselves (for example, think about computers, airplanes, etc. We can fly with airplanes, but we can't on our own and nor can airplanes fly 'on their own'). His biggest claim is that culture itself is an extension of man. Extensions also exist in their own evolutionary realm, as well. That is, they evolve on their own and do not directly influence human evolution.

The Dance of Life: The Other Dimension of Time (1983) describes different types of time in a provocative cross-cultural exploration of how time varies across cultures. Hall develops a classification system of nine different types of time. Particularly interesting are his ideas about how rhythms and music structure cultural interaction in different cultures.

The 'transference' of 'extension transference' is a term he coined to describe when people regard a symbol to actually be its referent. The clearest example of this would be language; like when people do not realize that words are merely symbolic to their referents. For example, there is nothing inherently watery about the physical object water, at least in terms of the symbolic acoustic properties that are produced when someone utters water. Evidence for this would be the fact that across languages there are thousands of unique words that all refer to water. Culture, as an extension, is also a good example; extension transference of culture happens naturally when people are unaware of the extent to which culture shapes how they perceive time and space, or that culture shapes their perception of them at all. Time and space are the two prominent aspects that Hall in particular focuses on in many of his works.

He died at his home in Santa Fe, New Mexico on July 20, 2009.

== Influence ==
According to Nina Brown, the work of Hall was so groundbreaking that it created a multitude of other areas for research. One of the most widely sought after topics of anthropology is an idea that was first introduced by Edward Hall: Anthropology of Space. Brown goes on to mention that the Anthropology of Space has essentially opened the door to dozens of new topics. Along with influencing the Anthropology of Space, Hall's research had a substantial influence on the development of intercultural communication as a research topic. Since at least 1990, he has been acknowledged frequently for his role in introducing nonverbal aspects of communication, specifically proxemics, the study of the social uses of space, the investigation of communication between members of different cultures. For example, Robert Shuter, a well-known intercultural communication researcher, commented: "Edward Hall's research reflects the regimen and passion of an anthropologist: a deep regard for culture explored principally by descriptive, qualitative methods... The challenge for intercultural communication... is to develop a research direction and teaching agenda that returns culture to preeminence and reflects the roots of the field as represented in Edward Hall's early research."

What was particularly innovative about Hall's early work is that instead of focusing on a single culture at a time, or cross-cultural comparison, as was typical in 1950s’ anthropology, he responded to the needs of his students at the Foreign Service Institute of the Department of State to help them understand interactions between members of different cultures. Hall points out that the only environment in which classroom dialogue is encountered is simply in the classroom, ergo it served the students little use when actually in the foreign country of interest. At the same time, and in response to the same students, he narrowed his focus from an entire culture, as was then standard within anthropology, to smaller moments of interaction. Colleagues working with him at FSI at the time included Henry Lee Smith, George L. Trager, Charles F. Hockett, and Ray Birdwhistell. Between them, they used descriptive linguistics as a model for not only proxemics but also kinesics and paralanguage.

== See also ==
- Symbolic interactionism

== Books ==
- Hall, Edward T.; Trager, George Leonard (1954). Culture and Communication: a model and an analysis.
- Hall, Edward T. (1990) [1959]. The silent language. New York: Anchor Books. ISBN 978-0-385-05549-9.
- Hall, Edward T. (1966). The Hidden Dimension. Knopf Doubleday Publishing Group. ISBN 978-0-385-08476-5.
- Hall, Edward Twitchell (1974). Handbook for Proxemic Research. Society for the Anthropology of Visual Communication.
- Hall, Mildred Reed; Hall, Edward Twitchell (1975). The Fourth Dimension in Architecture: The Impact of Building on Behavior : Eero Saarinen's Administrative Center for Deere & Company, Moline, Illinois. Sunstone Press. ISBN 978-0-86534-033-6.
- Hall, Edward T. (1976). Beyond Culture. Knopf Doubleday Publishing Group. ISBN 978-0-385-12474-4.
- Hall, Edward Twitchell (1983). The Dance of Life: The Other Dimension of Time. Knopf Doubleday Publishing Group. ISBN 978-0-385-19248-4.
- Hall, Edward T.; Hall, Mildred Reed (1990). Hidden differences : doing business with the Japanese. New York London Toronto: Anchor Books. ISBN 978-0-385-23884-7.
- Hall, Edward Twitchell (1992). An Anthropology of Everyday Life: An Autobiography. Doubleday. ISBN 978-0-385-23744-4.
- Hall, Edward T.; Hall, Mildred Reed (1990). Understanding Cultural Differences: Germans, French and Americans. Intercultural Press. ISBN 978-1-877864-07-0.
- Hall, Edward Twitchell (1994). West of the Thirties: Discoveries Among the Navajo and Hopi. Doubleday. ISBN 978-0-385-42421-9.

== Bibliography ==
- Leeds-Hurwitz, Wendy (1990). "Notes in the History of Intercultural Communication: The Foreign Service Institute and the Mandate for Intercultural Training". Quarterly Journal of Speech. 76 (3): 262–281. doi:10.1080/00335639009383919.
