= Taarof =

Iranian form of civility or art of etiquette

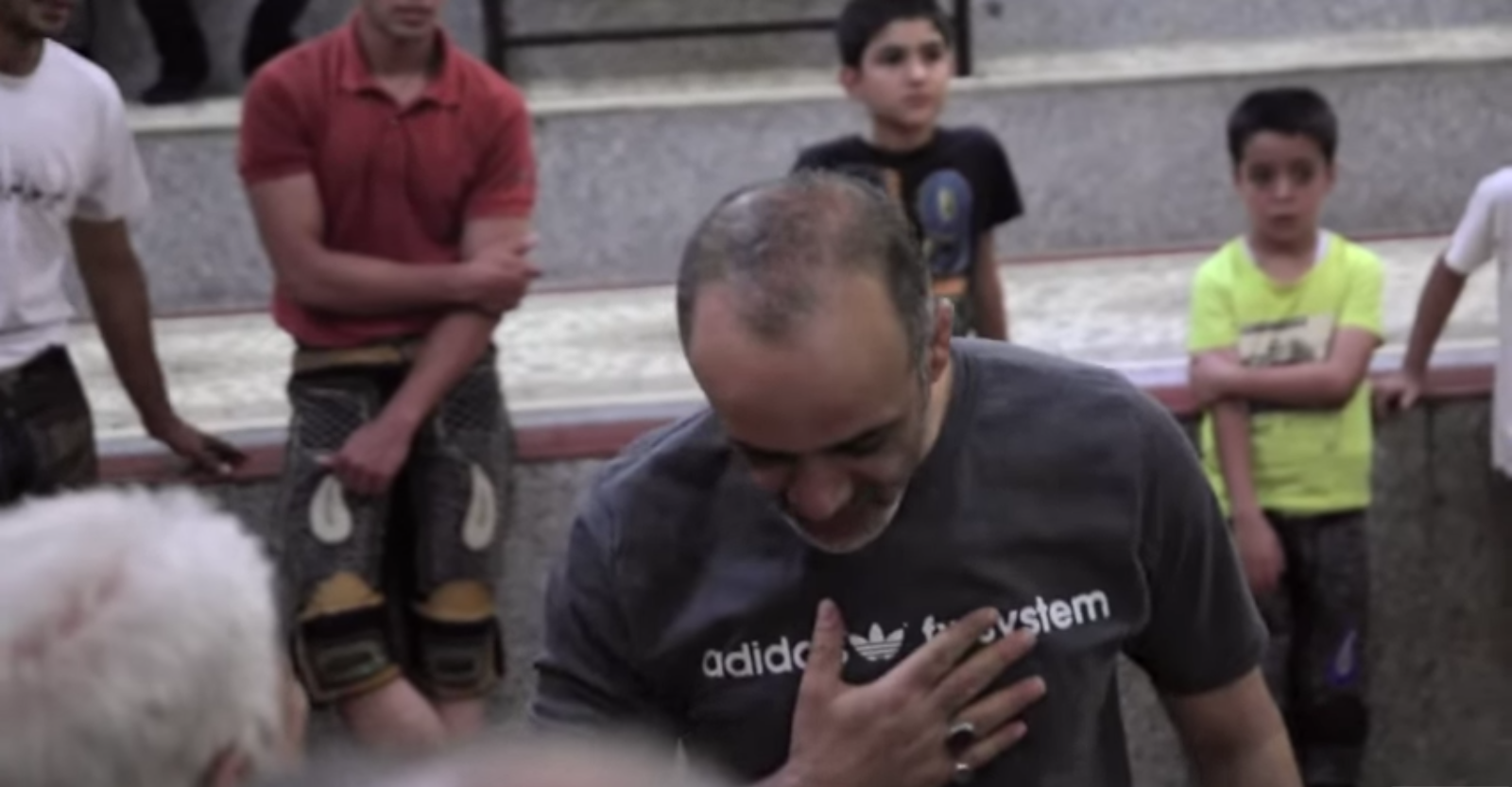
A Taarof gesture, where a man is bowing and holding his hand on the chest as a sign of respect and humbleness.

Taarof or tarof (Persian: تعارف) refers to an Iranian system of honour norms, a form of civility, or an art of etiquette, that emphasizes both deference and social rank. The system has linguistic as well as social behavioral components.

Taarof is a ritual politeness that levels the playing field and promotes equality in a hierarchical culture. Taarof between friends, or a host and guest, emphasizes the value of friendship as a priority. Another understanding is that taarof is a way of managing social relations with decorous manners. It could be used positively, as a basis for mutual goodwill, or negatively, as "a social or political weapon that confuses the recipient and puts him at a disadvantage". Taarof is sometimes considered as one of the most fundamental aspects for understanding Iranian culture, and the most important aspect of Iranian hospitality.

According to the scholar William O. Beeman, "Taarof is an extraordinarily difficult concept encompassing a broad complex of behaviors which mark and underscore differences in social status." For example, in Iranian culture, whoever walks through a doorway first gets a form of status, but the person who makes the other go through the door first also gains status by having made the other person do it through their show of grace and deference. When it comes to matters of rank, "one defers to superiors (tribute), and confers on inferiors (favor), presses honor on equals (neither tribute nor favor) or accepts the honor from a proper source, and thereby 'wins'." Status is relative for individuals in different interactions, according to Beeman, and rights and obligations shift constantly with changes in social environments.

== In social situations ==
In the rules of hospitality, taarof requires a host to offer anything a guest might want, and a guest is equally obliged to refuse it. This ritual may repeat itself several times (usually three times) before the host and guest finally determine whether the host's offer and the guest's refusal are genuine, or simply a show of politeness. If one is invited to any house for food, then one will be expected to eat seconds and thirds. However, taarof demands that one cannot go ahead and help oneself to more food after the first helping is finished. Good manners dictate that one must first pretend to be full, and tell the host how excellent the food was, and that it would be impossible to eat any more. The host is then expected to say one should not do taarof ("ta'arof nakon" - similar to "don't be polite!") for which the appropriate response would be to say "no" two or three times and then pretend to cave in to the host's insistence and pile on the food. Done any other way, one can come across as either starving or simply a bit uncouth. In this light, taarof can be viewed as an extreme form of conventionalized use of white lies.

Another example of taarof is inviting strangers or distant relatives for dinner with the expectation that they will recognize the offer as "merely taarof" and decline.

Another form of taarof is that when one gets invited to an Iranian home for food, it is highly appreciated if the guest helps the host in setting the table or with cleaning afterward. However, taarof can also force one into performing a task that one does not want to perform. For instance, if one friend offers a ride to another friend only to be polite, he may be forced to oblige if the friend agrees to take the ride. However, if one is going by the rules of taarof, one would refuse the offer many times before actually accepting and there would be a chance for the offer to be taken back.

Taarof often works in the opposite way. For example, an object, person, or offer may be refused when it is actually wanted. Taarof dictates for individuals refuse the favour or donation, no matter how badly it is needed. The refusing individual expects the object (or the favour) to be given anyway. However, the closer two people get in a relationship, the less taarof appears in their behavior towards one another.

== In negotiations ==
The prevalence of taarof often gives rise to distinctly Iranian styles of negotiation. For example, a worker negotiating a salary might begin with a eulogy of the employer, followed by a lengthy bargaining session consisting entirely of indirect polite language in which both parties are expected to understand the implied topic of discussion. Likewise, a shopkeeper may initially refuse to quote a price for an item and to suggest that it is worthless, or "unworthy" of the shopper ("ghaabel nadaareh"). Taarof obliges the customer to insist on paying, typically three times, before a shopkeeper finally quotes a price and real negotiation can begin. However, in the context of modern city life, sellers frequently bypass this exchange and quote a price immediately following the initial refusal.

That can often put tourists who are unfamiliar with taarof in difficult situations: for example, if a cab driver refuses to take payment, and a tourists accepts the "gift" at face value. When taxi drivers say that there is nothing to pay they do not mean it. They are actually saying that they have enjoyed talking with the rider and wish to express their thanks. By stating there is no charge, the taxi driver is playing the role of a good host. That behaviour comes from Iran's ancient heritage in which guests were always welcomed and looked after.

== Social status ==
The rules of taarof work differently depending on a person's social status. According to Beeman, there are few societies that take the obligations of status as seriously as Iranian society. A superior person is expected to treat an inferior person in patterns of mutual exchange as follows: doing something for another, providing material goods for another, and/or encouraging someone else to do (or provide) something. On the other hand, an inferior person is expected to provide services, provide tribute (to the superior), or petition others to do (or provide) something. Finally, if the interaction is between people of equal status, then exchanges are done without regard to status and are absolute. The ideal case of equal status is between two individuals involved in an intimate relationship, where the needs of others are anticipated and provided for without thought of service, tribute, favor, or reward.

The positive aspect of taarof encourages proper behavior toward others, particularly guests, polite language, propriety, gift giving, compliments, and showing regard to those who are truly deserving. According to Beeman, at its best, taarof is a form of selflessness and humility. However, taarof can be negative if it is used insincerely to control others, or if a superior person is shielded or protected from criticism due to deference.

== History ==
Taarof is considered an example of the implicit and high-context form of communication in Iranian culture, which is an outcome of collectivism.

Some political theorists have argued that during the period of serfdom, taarof regulated diplomatic discourse at princely courts. It involved a sharp curbing of one's behaviour, speech and action to make people, honour, and prestige calculable as instruments for political advancement.

According to D. M. Rejali, for the feudal elite, the ornamentation of speech symbolises prestige. With the advent of capitalism and its scientific paradigm, communication became more precise, and the formality of taarof became a hindrance in the pursuit for rapid capital accumulation.

== In other cultures ==
Taarof also resembles the institutionalized forms of speech acts in other cultures, including China.

An example of similar behaviour that is sometimes found in Western culture is the question of who pays a restaurant bill. That can be an awkward situation in which those at the table reach for their wallets. It is often resolved by social status; the bill is paid by the diner with the highest income, the most legitimate reason, or the most power. Still, all diners make a show of insisting on paying. In Southern Italy, a similar custom exists (fare i complimenti) that is part of table manners.

Another example occurs if a Western individual is not familiar with taarof in Iranian culture. When an Iranian individual is offering taarof, it is to first view it as a sincere offer with the hope of decline up to four or five times. If the individual offers more than five times, it can be concluded that the individual is not doing taarof, and the opposite side should respectfully thank that individual and accept the offer with gratitude.

== See also ==
- Ghahr and Âshti
- Customs and etiquette in Indian dining
