= George L. Trager =

American linguist (1906–1992)

George Leonard Trager
- Born: March 22, 1906; Newark, New Jersey, United States
- Died: August 31, 1992 (aged 86); Pasadena, California

Academic background
- Education: Southern Methodist University, Northern Illinois University

Academic work
- Discipline: Linguist
- Institutions: Linguistic Society of America, International Auxiliary Language Association
- Notable works: Interlingua

George Leonard Trager (/ˈtreɪɡər/; March 22, 1906 – August 31, 1992) was an American linguist. He was the president of the Linguistic Society of America in 1960.

He was born in Newark, New Jersey.

During his years at Yale in the 1930s and 1940s, he was a close associate of Edward Sapir, Morris Swadesh, Benjamin Lee Whorf, Charles Hockett, and after 1941, Leonard Bloomfield. From 1937, he collaborated with Whorf on historical-comparative Azteco-Tanoan languages, but further planned collaboration was cut short by Whorf's death in 1941. He wrote the entries on Language and Linguistics for the 14th edition of the Encyclopædia Britannica. Like Sapir and Swadesh, he was a consultant of the International Auxiliary Language Association, which presented Interlingua in 1951.

In the 1950s, Trager worked at the Foreign Service Institute of the Department of State, helping to train diplomats prior to their departure abroad. He worked there with Edward T. Hall, Henry Lee Smith, Charles F. Hockett, and Ray Birdwhistell. Trager's project was the development of paralanguage, while Birdwhistell worked on kinesics and Hall worked on proxemics.

He taught linguistics at Southern Methodist University in Dallas, Tx from 1970 to 1971. In 1971, he moved to Northern Illinois University in DeKalb and stayed there until his retirement in 1974. (For details, see George Leonard Trager by Charles F. Hockett, Language, Vol. 69, No. 4 (Dec., 1993), pp. 778-788 (11 pages)

He died in Pasadena, California.

== Selected works ==
- Bloch, Bernard; & Trager, George L. (1942). Outline of linguistic analysis. Special publications of the Linguistic Society of America. Baltimore: Linguistic Society of America.
- Correction: George Leonard Trager. (1994). Language, 70 (4), 868.
- Hockett, Charles F. (1993). George Leonard Trager. Language, 69 (4), 778–788.
- Smith, M. Estellie (Ed.). (1972). Studies in linguistics in honor of George L. Trager. The Hague: Mouton.
- Sturtevant, E. H.; & Trager, George L. (1942). Hittite u before vowels. Language, 18 (4), 259–270.
- Sturtevant, E. H.; & Trager, George L. (1943). Hittite i before vowels. Language, 19 (3), 209–220.
- Trager, Felicia H. (1971). An annotated bibliography of the publications and writings of George L. Trager through 1970. Studies in Linguistics occasional papers (No. 12).
- Trager, George L. (1930). The pronunciation of "short a" in American Standard English. American Speech 5:396–400.
- Trager, George L. (1933). The Old Church Slavonic Kiev fragment its accents and their relation to modern Slavonic accentuation. Language monograph (No. 13). Language, 9 (1), 4–28.
- Trager, George L. (1934). What conditions limit variants of a phoneme? American Speech, 9, 313–15.
- Trager, George L. (1934). The phonemes of Russian. Language, 10 (4), 334–344.
- Trager, George L. (1935). Some Spanish place names of Colorado. American Speech, 10 (3), 203–207.
- Trager, George L. (1936). ðə lɛŋgwiɟ əv ðə pweblow əv Taos (*nuw meksikow) [The language of the pueblo of Taos (New Mexico)]. Maître Phonétique, 56, 59–62. JSTOR 44704883
- Trager, George L. (1938). "Cottonwood-tree", a south-western linguistic trait. International Journal of American Linguistics, 9 (2/4), 117–118.
- Trager, George L. (1939). The days of the week in the language of Taos Pueblo, New Mexico. Language, 15, 51–55.
- Trager, George L. (1940). Appendix. In E. C. Parsons, Taos Tales. New York.
- Trager, George L. (1940). One phonemic entity becomes two: The case of "short a. American Speech, 15, 255–58.
- Trager, George L. (1940). Serbo-Croatian accents and quantities. Language, 16 (1), 29–32.
- Trager, George L. (1940). The Russian gender categories. Language, 16 (4), 300–307.
- Trager, George L. (1941). ə ˈnəwt on æ ənd æ̝ˑ in əˈmerikən ˈiŋɡliʃ [A note on æ and æ̝ˑ in American English]. Maître Phonétique, 17–19. JSTOR 44708001
- Trager, George L. (1941). Auxiliary verbs in Russian. Language, 17 (2), 151–152.
- Trager, George L. (1942). The phoneme 'T': A study in theory and method. American Speech, 17 (3), 144–148.
- Trager, George L. (1942). The historical phonology of the Tiwa languages. Studies in Linguistics, 1 (5), 1–10.
- Trager, George L. (1942). The phonemic treatment of semivowels. Language, 18 (3), 220–223.
- Trager, George L. (1942). Introduction to Russian, a course for college students. New Haven: Yale University, Department of Oriental Studies.
- Trager, George L. (1943). The kinship and status terms of the Tiwa languages. American Anthropologist, 45 (1), 557–571.
- Trager, George L. (1944). Spanish and English loanwords in Taos. International Journal of American Linguistics, 10 (4), 144–158.
- Trager, George L. (1944). The verb morphology of spoken French. Language, 20 (3), 131–141.
- Trager, George L. (1945). Analysis of a Kechuan text. International Journal of American Linguistics, 11 (2), 86–96.
- Trager, George L. (1946). An outline of Taos grammar. In C. Osgood (Ed.), Linguistic structures in North America (pp. 184–221). New York: Wenner-Green Foundation for Anthropological Research.
- Trager, George L. (1946). Changes of emphasis in linguistics: A comment. Studies in Philology, 43, 461–464.
- Trager, George L. (1948). The Indian languages of Brazil. International Journal of American Linguistics, 14 (1), 43–48.
- Trager, George L. (1948). A status symbol and personality at Taos Pueblo. Southwestern Journal of Anthropology, 4 (3), 299–304.
- Trager, George L. (1948). Taos I: A language revisited. International Journal of American Linguistics, 14 (3), 155–160.
- Trager, George L. (1949). The field of linguistics. Studies in Linguistics occasional papers (No. 1).
- Trager, George L. (1951). Linguistic history and ethnologic history in the Southwest. Journal of the Washington Academy of Sciences, 41, 341–343.
- Trager, George L. (1951). Linguistics. Science, 114 (2967), 3a.
- Trager, George L. (1951). Linguistic history and ethnologic history in the Southwest. Journal of the Washington Academy of Sciences, 41, 341–343.
- Trager, George L. (1953). Russian declensional morphemes. Language, 29 (3), 326–338.
- Trager, George L. (1954). Taos II: Pronominal reference. International Journal of American Linguistics, 20 (3), 173–180.
- Trager, George L. (1955). The language of America. American Anthropologist, 57 (6), 1182–1193.
- Trager, George L. (1955). French morphology: Verb inflection. Language, 31 (4), 511–529.
- Trager, George L. (1958). French morphology: Personal pronouns and the 'definite article'. Language, 34 (2), 225–231.
- Trager, George L. (1958). Paralanguage: A first approximation. Studies in Linguistics, 13, 1–12.
- Trager, George L. (1960). Taos III: Paralanguage. Anthropological Linguistics, 2 (2), 24–30.
- Trager, George L. (1960). The name of Taos, New Mexico. Anthropological Linguistics, 2 (3), 5–6.
- Trager, George L. (1961). Taos IV: Morphemics, syntax, semology in nouns and in pronominal reference. International Journal of American Linguistics, 27 (3), 211–222.
- Trager, George L. (1961). The typology of paralanguage. Anthropological Linguistics, 3 (1), 17–21.
- Trager, George L. (1962). A scheme for the cultural analysis of sex. Southwestern Journal of Anthropology, 18 (2), 114–118.
- Trager, George L. (1963). Linguistics is linguistics. Studies in Linguistics occasional papers (No. 8).
- Trager, George L. (1965). A schematic outline for the processual analysis of culture. Buffalo, NY: SUNY at Buffalo.
- Trager, George L. (1967). A componential morphemic analysis of English personal pronouns. Language, 43 (1), 372–378.
- Trager, George L. (1967). The Tanoan settlement of the Rio Grande area: A possible chronology. In D. H. Hymes & W. E. Bittle (Eds.), Studies in southwestern ethnolinguistics: Meaning and history in the languages of the American Southwest (pp. 335–350). The Hague: Mouton.
- Trager, George L. (1969). Taos and Picuris: How long separated?. International Journal of American Linguistics, 35 (2), 180–182.
- Trager, George L. (1972). Language and languages. San Francisco: Chandler Publishing Company.
- Trager, George L. (1975). Language nomenclature. Studies in Linguistics, 25, 1–8.
- Trager, George L.; & Bloch, Bernard. (1941). The syllabic phonemes of English. Language, 17 (3), 223–246.
- Trager, George L.; & Harben, Felicia E. (1958). North American Indian languages: Classification and maps. Studies in Linguistics occasional papers (No. 5). Buffalo, NY: University of Buffalo, Department of Anthropology and Linguistics.
- Trager, George L.; & Mutziger, John G. (1947). The linguistic structure of Mongolian placenames. Journal of the American Oriental Society, 67 (3), 184–195.
- Trager, George L.; & Rice, Frank A. (1954). The personal-pronoun system of Classical Arabic. Language, 30 (2), 224–229.
- Trager, George L.; & Smith, Henry L. (1950). A chronology of Indo-Hittite. Studies in Linguistics, 80, 61–70.
- Trager, George L.; & Smith, Henry L. (1951). An outline of English structure. Studies in Linguistics occasional papers (No. 3). Norman, OK: Battenberg Press.
- Trager, George L.; & Smith, Henry L. (1953). The chronology of North European: A rejoinder. American Anthropologist, 55 (2), 295–299.
- Trager, George L.; & Trager, Edith Crowell. (1959). Kiowa and Tanoan. American Anthropologist, 61 (6), 1078–1083.
- Trager, George L.; & Valdez, Genevieve. (1937). English loans in Colorado Spanish. American Speech, 12 (1), 34–44.
- Whorf, Benjamin L.; & Trager, George L. (1937). The relationship of Uto-Aztecan and Tanoan. American Anthropologist, 39, 609–624.
- Trager, George L.; & Benjamin L. Whorf. International Encyclopedia of the Social Sciences (Vol. 16, pp. 536–38). -->

== See also ==
Paralanguage
