= Yves Winkin =

Belgian professor/administrator mostly working in France

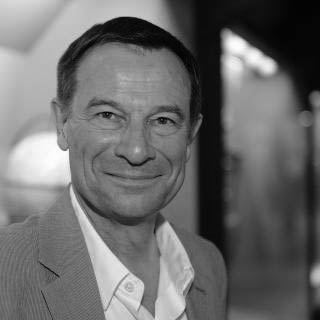
Yves Winkin

Yves Winkin is a Belgian academic who spent much of his career based in France. He is known for work in communication, specifically for developing the anthropology of communication, for introducing the concept of enchantment to the social sciences, for investigating pedestrian behavior, and for his analyses of Erving Goffman's work in relation to his life. At various times, he worked with Pierre Bourdieu in France, as well as Goffman, Dell Hymes, and Ray Birdwhistell in the US, leading to his efforts to share research across international borders. In addition, he has held three kinds of administrative position (first a university administrator, then a director of a national institute, and finally director of a museum).

== Early life and education ==
Born in Verviers, Belgium, Winkin's undergraduate specializations at the University of Liège were philosophy (1972–1974) and information and communication sciences (1974–1976). He earned a Master of Arts in Communication from the Annenberg School for Communication at the University of Pennsylvania in 1979. In February 1982, he received his doctorate from the University of Liège.

== Career ==
Winkin was a faculty member at the University of Liège in Belgium (1976–99), moving to the École Normale Supérieure de Lyon in France, first as a faculty member, then as deputy director in charge of Research and International Relations, finally as Director of the Institut français de l’Éducation (the French national institute of education). In 2015 he moved to the Conservatoire national des arts et métiers in Paris, where he was both deputy director for Scientific and Technical Culture and director of the Musée des Arts et Métiers until his retirement in 2019. At that point, a festschrift was prepared to acknowledge his contributions, especially on the topic of enchantment.

Winkin has also worked internationally, including as a Visiting Associate Professor at the University of California, Berkeley, in 1987; Massey University in New Zealand in 1989; as a substitute professor at the University of Geneva from 1992 to 2006; the Universidade Federal do Rio de Janeiro in Brazil in 1995; the University of Pennsylvania in 1997–98; the Universidade Estadual de Campinas in Brazil in 1998; and at El Colegio de Michoacán in Samora, Mexico, in 2006. He was Harron Family Endowed Chair in Communication at Villanova University in Philadelphia in 2012, and then Visiting Professor of Communication at the Chinese University of Hong Kong in 2013.

== Research ==
Winkin's research has primarily contributed to the following topics:

=== Anthropology of communication ===
La Nouvelle Communication (The new communication, 1981) introduced American research to the French-speaking audience, documenting a shift from the older telegraph model to a new orchestra metaphor for interaction. It brings together the work of such writers as Paul Watzlawick, Gregory Bateson, and Ray Birdwhistell. The book has been translated into several languages (including Spanish, Portuguese and Greek). In 1984, he organized an international conference on Bateson and the Palo Alto Group at Centre culturel international de Cerisy-la-Salle, which included Mary Catherine Bateson and Paul Watzlawick as presenters. In 2001, this was expanded to an entire book on the anthropology of communication, which was then translated into Spanish, Portuguese, and Polish.

=== Erving Goffman ===
Since the early 1980s, Winkin has written about Erving Goffman, the Canadian/American sociologist. The most substantial contributions are Erving Goffman: Les moments et leurs hommes (Erving Goffman: Moments and their men, 1988, translated into Spanish, Portuguese, and Japanese), and D'Erving à Goffman: Une oeuvre performée? (From Erving to Goffman: A work in performance?, 2022). Overall, Winkin's "extensive research on Goffman’s biography" has been critical to our understanding, given that Goffman refused to share much himself. When Goffman's dissertation was published online, Winkin was chosen to write the introduction and frame the work for readers.

=== Enchantment ===
Starting in the mid-1990s, Winkin has developed an "anthropology of enchantment". "Enchantment engineering" explains "how urban planners try to create not only a physical structure but also a specific atmosphere". In this way, the concept of enchantment has become linked to what was originally a separate research strand, investigating pedestrian behavior. Most often in collaboration with Swiss scholar Sonia Lavadinho, Winkin has analyzed urban walking as an example of enchantment, most significantly in two books. In 2021, a conference devoted to enchantment was held at Cerisy-la-Salle, honoring his contributions to the topic, resulting in the publication of a book.

=== Museums ===
In addition to directing the museum of CNAM, Winkin has published about museums, most significantly through a book published in 2020, the year after he retired. In addition, between 2014 and 2018 he was co-editor of the journal Culture et Musées.

== Selected bibliography ==
- Winkin, Y. (1981). La nouvelle communication [The new communication]. Éditions du Seuil. ISBN 2020427842
- Winkin, Y., ed. (1988). Bateson: Premier état d'un héritage [Bateson: First step of an inheritance]. Éditions du Seuil. ISBN 2020100401.
- Winkin, Y. (1988). Erving Goffman: Les moments et leurs hommes [Erving Goffman: Moments and their men]. Éditions du Seuil. ISBN 2020099845.
- Winkin, Y. (2001). Anthropologie de la communication: De la théorie au terrain [The anthropology of communication: From theory to field]. Éditions du Seuil. ISBN 202040284X.
- Winkin, Y. (2020). Réinventer les musées? [Reinventing museums?]. MkF Éditions. ISBN 979-1092305609.
- Winkin, Y. (2022). D'Erving à Goffman: Une oeuvre performée? [From Erving to Goffman: A work performed]. MkF Éditions. ISBN 979-1092305890.
