= Enchantment (social sciences) =

Social science term

Enchantment is a term widely used to describe something delightful, possibly magical, that causes a feeling of wonder. It has been adapted by a range of scholars across multiple disciplines, especially anthropology and sociology, and then later urban studies, to describe the ways in which people create moments of wonder in the midst of everyday life. British anthropologist Alfred Gell described art as "the technology of enchantment," permitting us to "see the real world in an enchanted form". American sociologist George Ritzer uses the term enchantment in his analysis of consumerism and McDonaldization, making the argument that "enchantment of the consumer is necessary for the spell to work".

== Enchantment engineers ==
A different strand was developed by Belgian scholar Yves Winkin, who highlighted the element of collusion between "enchantment engineers" (the people who create something requiring the willing suspension of disbelief) and visitors to locations where the illusion or wonder has been created to delight them. Enchantment here is about experiencing a moment of unexpected pleasure or happiness, focusing not on times it occurs randomly, but when it results from someone's deliberate efforts. In these cases, enchantment refers to "places and landscapes created with the intention of inducing a state of euphoria in those who frequent them". Often people are not actually fooled by an enchantment, rather they choose to set aside their understanding of the everyday in order to participate in fooling themselves, so there is active collusion between engineers and visitors.

Initially the concept of enchantment was assumed to apply to places deliberately constructing illusions, such as Disneyland, historic sites, or carnivals. Creating each of these contexts requires enchantment engineers to make certain design decisions in order to achieve specific responses from visitors. Disneyland has its own enchantment engineers, called "imagineers" (Walt Disney Imagineering). Ordinary people thus experience a world which has been deliberately prepared by professionals, a world different from their everyday reality. Many later discussions have described such contexts, including any location that draws tourists, but especially historic sites, including historic buildings and the various ways attention can be drawn to them (as with unique lighting displays).

== Enchantment and walking ==
Enchantment has been applied to walking and pedestrian behavior generally, first to historic walking paths (e.g., the pilgrimage to Compostela), and then more broadly to pedestrian behavior and urban experiences. Most often, the focus has been on places of enchantment located throughout a city. Much of this strand of research emphasizes amenities which are not only functional but aesthetically pleasing. This is a two-part process: someone (the enchantment engineer) has to design something, but then nothing noteworthy happens until other people come along to appreciate it (tourists or visitors, or just everyday pedestrians). In this case, visitors only need to be "ready to surrender to a brief denial of reality" for enchantment to occur. Such elements as pocket gardens in Geneva may create a moment of enchantment for those who pass by. The discovery of a garden where none was expected is thus understood as a source of enchantment bringing pleasure to those walking. This in turn encourages the development of community among strangers within a city, so urban planners became interested. A frequent focus of study has been tourists in particular. In 2021, a colloquium at Centre culturel international de Cerisy-la-Salle, a conference center in northwest France, examined what had been done with the concept by that point, resulting in a book.

== Enchantment and art ==
In the 2020s, there has been a return to art as a source of enchantment, specifically examining the display of moving images onto buildings, fountains, or even trees in public spaces, and how these can bring about "moments of enchantment shared between members of the public". However, the focus on enchantment as "a type of encounter that is both unexpected and wondrous" remains the same.
