= Beyond Culture =

1976 book by Edward T. Hall

- First edition cover
- Author: Edward T. Hall
- Publisher: Doubleday
- Publication date: 1976

Beyond Culture is a 1976 book by the American anthropologist Edward T. Hall.
