= Ray Birdwhistell =

American anthropologist

- Born: September 29, 1918; Cincinnati, Ohio, U.S.
- Died: October 19, 1994 (aged 76); Brigantine, New Jersey, U.S.
- Education: Miami University (BA); Ohio State University (MA); University of Chicago (Phd)

Ray L. Birdwhistell (September 29, 1918 – October 19, 1994) was an American anthropologist who founded kinesics as a field of inquiry and research. Birdwhistell coined the term kinesics, meaning "facial expression, gestures, posture and gait, and visible arm and body movements". He estimated that "no more than 30 to 35 percent of the social meaning of a conversation or an interaction is carried by the words." Stated more broadly, he argued that "words are not the only containers of social knowledge." He proposed other technical terms, including kineme, and many others less frequently used today.

Birdwhistell had at least as much impact on the study of language and social interaction generally as just nonverbal communication because he was interested in the study of communication more broadly than is often recognized. Birdwhistell understood body movements to be culturally patterned rather than universal. His students were required to read widely, sources not only in communication but also anthropology and linguistics. "Birdwhistell himself was deeply disappointed that his general communicative interests and goals were not appropriately understood." Collaborations with others, including initially Margaret Mead and Gregory Bateson, and later, Erving Goffman and Dell Hymes had huge influence on his work. For example, the book he is best known for, Kinesics and Context, "would not have appeared if it had not been envisaged by Erving Goffman" and he explicitly stated "the paramount and sustaining influence upon my work has been that of anthropological linguistics", a tradition most directly represented at the University of Pennsylvania by Hymes.

== Life and work ==
Birdwhistell was born in Cincinnati on September 29, 1918, and died October 19, 1994. He was raised and went to school in Ohio. He graduated from Fostoria High School in 1936, and was involved in the history club, debate team, journalism, and school plays. Birdwhistell received his BA in sociology in 1940 from Miami University, his MA in anthropology in 1941 from Ohio State University, and his PhD in anthropology in 1951 from the University of Chicago, where he studied with Lloyd Warner and Fred Eggan. From 1944 to 1946 he conducted dissertation fieldwork among the Kutenai Indians of British Columbia during which he first realized that tribal members moved differently depending on whether they were speaking English or Kutenai, which sparked his interest in nonverbal behavior. While completing his dissertation, he taught at the University of Toronto (Ontario), where Erving Goffman was one of his students. From 1944 to 1946 he was lecturer in anthropology at the University of Toronto, working with G. Gordon Brown and Edmund S. Carpenter, who were in the same department.

In 1946 he went to Kentucky and took a position at the University of Louisville, where he taught for 10 years, and helped in racial integration of the university. While there he established the Interdisciplinary Committee on Culture and Communication, and organized a series of annual seminars on Culture and Communication, resulting in the publication of Explorations in Communication. In addition to Edmund Snow Carpenter, Marshall McLuhan, and Birdwhistell, Lawrence K. Frank, Robert Graves, Dorothy D. Lee, and David Riesman contributed.

Through the 1950s he participated in multiple interdisciplinary collaborations: at the Foreign Service Institute of the United States Department of State, where he first outlined his ideas about the study of nonverbal behavior, working with Edward T. Hall, Henry Lee Smith, George L. Trager, Charles F. Hockett; at the Macy Conferences on Group Processes, with Gregory Bateson, Margaret Mead, and many others; and at the Center for Advanced Study in the Behavioral Sciences, where he participated in the Natural History of an Interview project with Gregory Bateson, Frieda Fromm-Reichmann, Norman A. McQuown, Henry W. Brosin, and others.

Birdwhistell taught at the State University of New York at Buffalo from 1956 to 1959. In 1959 he was appointed senior research scientist at the Eastern Pennsylvania Psychiatric Institute, and simultaneously Professor of Research in Anthropology at Temple University in Philadelphia. At EPPI he managed a lab that included a fully equipped 16mm film studio, a resident cinematographer (Jacques van Vlack), an artist who illustrated research findings, and numerous graduate students and visitors who conferred with him and his colleague, psychiatrist Albert E. Scheflen. As a result, Birdwhistell was at the hub of an informal, interdisciplinary network of scholars in anthropology, ethology, linguistics, and psychiatry that "made up in vitality what it lacked in organization and professional identity."

Birdwhistell argued strongly for the use of film as an essential tool in the study of nonverbal behavior as a way to permit "observation and analysis of human social behavior which has hitherto been hidden from comparative analysis". Together with Jacques van Vlack (the filmmaker), he prepared a series of films that were commercially available, although, as with his teaching, they were intended mostly for a technically trained audience.

1. Microcultural Incidents in Ten Zoos, an edited version of a Birdwhistell and van Vlack presentation from an American Anthropological Association convention, compares family interactions while feeding elephants at 10 zoos based in 7 countries (England, France, Italy, India, Japan, Hong Kong, and the United States). Filming was viewed as a second step, following observation to discover recurrent patterns. Birdwhistell himself and Mead often showed this film to their students.

2. TDR- 009, an eighty-minute 16 mm black-and-white sound film of an English pub scene in a middle class London hotel. Birdwhistell and van Vlack observed behavior of listeners in relationship to speakers during the film.

3. Lecture on Kinesics by Ray L. Birdwhistell at the Second Linguistic-Kinesic Conference Nov. 4–7, 1964, is simply a documentary record of two lectures Birdwhistell presented to a seminar group assembled for a few days to learn from his research team at EPPI in 1964. Seminar participants were primarily senior research scientists, including linguists, psychiatrists, anthropologists, and psychologists; McQuown and Scheflen, working with Birdwhistell on the Natural History of an Interview project, were among the participants.

Much of the work at EPPI was a continuation of the Natural History of an Interview project, working mostly with Scheflen, while Brosin continued different parts of the same project from the Western Psychiatric Institute & Clinic in Pennsylvania with Adam Kendon, William S. Condon, Kai Erikson, Harvey Sarles, and occasional visits from Bateson. The two teams kept in touch, meeting several days per month between 1960 and 1964 to complete their analysis. A third team, under McQuown's direction at the University of Chicago, included Starkey Duncan Jr., William M. Austin, Raven McDavid Jr., and William Offenkrantz. The Chicago team focused on paralanguage (non-lexical aspects of voice, including intonation), while the Pennsylvania teams attended to kinesics (body motion communication). The final report was completed in 1968, but proved unpublishable due to its length (5 volumes), and the complexity of the transcriptions (taking up 3 of the 5 volumes), so it was circulated via the microfilm series of the University of Chicago.

From 1969 until he retired in 1988, Birdwhistell held the position of professor at the Annenberg School for Communication at the University of Pennsylvania, where he worked closely with Dell Hymes and Erving Goffman, brought Gregory Bateson in as a guest speaker, and influenced a new generation of students. It was commonly understood that "no serious doctoral student at the University of Pennsylvania who was interested in culture and human conduct" could avoid his courses.

Birdwhistell reputedly came to the attention of Margaret Mead and Gregory Bateson when he attended a showing of one of their ethnographic films (they were pioneers of the use of film as an ethnographic tool). "Legend has it that Birdwhistell was a younger anthropologist listening to Mead and others comment on a Balinese film when he interjected something like, 'But did you see what the mother did with the baby after she took him out of the bath?' He then brought to their attention a fascinating medley of actions that occurred in a few seconds". Both Mead and Bateson became lifelong supporters and influences. He was also influenced by David Efron's earlier work, the first major study of the influence of culture on gesture prepared under Franz Boas, noted American anthropologist, and Eliot D. Chapple's work on rhythms of dialogue (Chapple is the one who introduced the term interaction to the study of behavior, knocked down a wall at Harvard University so he could establish a one-way screen for observing conversations in the 1930s, and was an early adopter of computer analysis of interaction patterns in the 1960s).

Birdwhistell died of liver cancer on October 19, 1994, at his home in Brigantine, New Jersey.

== Influence ==
Through his involvement in the multidisciplinary projects at the Foreign Service Institute, at the Macy Conferences, and most especially through the Natural History of an Interview project, Birdwhistell helped to establish the study of nonverbal behavior as a central part of communication, as well as influencing critical members of the next generation of nonverbal scholars. Some of the major early books discussing nonverbal communication that owe a substantial debt to Birdwhistell and his research were Sebeok, Hayes and Bateson (1964), Davis (1973), Scheflen (1973), Kendon, Harris and Key (1975), Kendon (1977), Sarles (1977), Wolfgang (1979), and Davis (1982).

Birdwhistell's students include:

- University of Toronto: Erving Goffman
- Eastern Pennsylvania Psychiatric Institute: Paul Byers, Alan Lomax
- University of Pennsylvania: María Cátedra and Yves Winkin

Goffman became one of the best-known sociologists with an international reputation, and nearly all of his publications became best sellers. Birdwhistell influenced Lomax's development of cantometrics and choreometrics. Byers was quite important in the study of visual communication. Winkin went on to develop the anthropology of communication in Europe.

Birdwhistell pointed out that "human gestures differ from those of other animals in that they are polysemic, that they can be interpreted to have many different meanings depending on the communicative context in which they are produced". And, he "resisted the idea that "body language" could be deciphered in some absolute fashion". He also indicated that "every body movement must be interpreted broadly and in conjunction with every other element in communication"

Birdwhistell's first book Introduction to Kinesics, was published in 1952, but as this was essentially an internal publication for the Department of State, his second book, Kinesics and Context has been cited far more often, and, along with a brief encyclopedia article on kinesics, has had far greater influence on the study of communication behavior. Many of Birdwhistell's publications were short pieces, gathered together to make up Kinesics and Context.

Birdwhistell viewed communication as a continuous, multichannel (today, the more common term is multimodal) process through which and in which social interaction occurs. Although he is best known for inventing kinesics, his influence was much larger: he helped establish the logical underpinnings of language and social interaction research generally, and such approaches as the coordinated management of meaning.

== Publications ==
Books

- Birdwhistell, R. L. (1952). Introduction to Kinesics: An Annotation System for Analysis of Body Motion and Gesture. Washington, DC: Department of State, Foreign Service Institute.
- Birdwhistell, R. L. (1970). Kinesics and Context: Essays on Body Motion Communication. Philadelphia: University of Pennsylvania Press.

Shorter publications (partial)

- Birdwhistell, R. L. (1956). Kinesic analysis of filmed behavior of children. In B. Schaffner (Ed.), Group Processes: Transactions of the second conference (pp. 141–144). New York: Josiah Macy, Jr. Foundation.
- Birdwhistell, R. L. (1959). Contribution of Linguistic-Kinesic Studies for the Understanding of Schizophrenia. In A. Auerback (Ed.), Schizophrenia (pp. 99–123). New York: Ronald Press.
- Birdwhistell, R, L. (1960). Implications of Recent Developments in Communication Research for Evolutionary Theory. In W. M. Austin (Ed.), Report of the Ninth Annual Round Table Meeting on Linguistics and Language Study (pp. 149–155). Washington, D.C.: Georgetown University Press.
- Birdwhistell, R. L. (1961). Paralanguage 25 Years After Sapir. In H. W. Brosin (Ed.), Lectures on Experimental Psychiatry (pp. 43–63). Pittsburgh: University of Pittsburgh Press.
- Birdwhistell, R. L. (1961). "[Review of The First Five Minutes.]". Archives of General Psychiatry. 5: 106–108. doi:10.1001/archpsyc.1961.01710130108016.
- Birdwhistell, R. L. (1962). Critical Moments in the Psychiatric Interview. In T. T. Tourlentes (Ed.), Research Approaches to a Psychiatric Problem (pp. 179–188). New York: Grune and Stratton.
- Birdwhistell, R. L. (1968). "Communication". International Encyclopedia of the Social Sciences. 8: 24–29.
- Birdwhistell, R. L. (1968). "Kinesics". International Encyclopedia of the Social Sciences. 8: 379–385.
- Birdwhistell, R. L. (1968). "[Comments on Edward Hall's Proxemics.]". Current Anthropology. 9 (2–3): 95–96. doi:10.1086/200975. S2CID 147398417.
- Birdwhistell, R. L. (1971). Kinesics: Inter- and Intra-channel communication research. In J. Kristeva, J. Rey-Debove & D. J. Umiker (Eds.), Essays in semiotics/Essais de semiotique (pp. 527–546). The Hague: Mouton.
- Birdwhistell, R. L. (1971). Chapter 3: Body Motion, In N. A. McQuown (Ed.), The Natural History of an Interview (pp. 1–93). Microfilm Collection of Manuscripts on Cultural Anthropology, Fifteenth Series, Chicago: University of Chicago, Joseph Regenstein Library, Department of Photoduplication.
- Birdwhistell, R. L. (1971). Appendix 6: Sample Kinesic Transcription. In N. A. McQuown (Ed.), The Natural History of an Interview (pp. 1–29). Microfilm Collection of Manuscripts on Cultural Anthropology, Fifteenth Series. Chicago: University of Chicago, Joseph Regenstein Library, Department of Photoduplication.
- Birdwhistell, R. L. (1974). The language of the body: The natural environment of words. In A. Silverstein (Ed.), Human communication (pp. 203–220). Hillsdale, NJ: Lawrence Erlbaum.
- Birdwhistell, R. L. (1975). Background considerations of the study of the body as a medium of 'expression.' In J. Benthall & T. Polhemus (Eds.), The body as a medium of expression (pp. 34–58). New York: E. P. Dutton.
- Birdwhistell, R. L. (1977). Some Discussion of Ethnography, Theory, and Method, In J. Brockman (Ed.), About Bateson (pp. 101–141). New York: E. P. Dunon.
- Birdwhistell, R. L., C. F. Hockett, & N. A. McQuown. (1971). Chapter 6: Transcript, Transcription and Commentary. In N. A. McQuown (Ed,), The Natural History of an Interview [n,p,]. Microfilm Collection of Manuscripts on Cultural Anthropology, Fifteenth Series, Chicago: University of Chicago, Joseph Regenstein Library. Department of Photoduplication.

Interviews and lectures

- Gross, T. (1979) Dr. Birdwhistell's Body Language. Fresh Air with Terry Gross, WHYY, Philadelphia, 29 June 1979. https://freshairarchive.org/segments/dr-birdwhistells-body-language
- McDermott, R. (1980). Profile: Ray L. Birdwhistell. The Kinesis Report. 2 (3): 1–4, 14–16.
- Talese, G. (2010.) Dr. Birdwhistell and the Athletes. In Michael Rosenwald (Ed.), The Silent Season of a Hero: The Sports Writing of Gay Talese (pp. 186–200). New York: Walker & Co.
- Watter, S. B. (2021). Ray L. Birdwhistell, “Lecture at American Museum of Natural History, October 4, 1980." In J. McElvenny & A. Ploder (Eds.), Holisms of Communication: The Early History of Audio-Visual Sequence Analysis (pp. 249–263). Berlin: Language Science Press. doi:10.5281/zenodo.5142265.

== See also ==
- Macy Conferences
- Kinesics
