= High-context and low-context cultures =

Social context in understanding culture

In anthropology, high-context and low-context cultures are ends of a continuum of how explicit the messages exchanged in a culture are and how important the context is in communication. The distinction between cultures with high and low contexts is intended to draw attention to variations in both spoken and non-spoken forms of communication. The continuum pictures how people communicate with others through their range of communication abilities: utilizing gestures, relations, body language, verbal messages, or non-verbal messages.

"High-" and "low-" context cultures typically refer to language groups, nationalities, or regional communities. However, the concept may also apply to corporations, professions, and other cultural groups, as well as to settings such as online and offline communication.

High-context cultures often exhibit less-direct verbal and nonverbal communication, utilizing small communication gestures and reading more meaning into these less-direct messages. Low-context cultures do the opposite; direct verbal communication is needed to properly understand a message being communicated and relies heavily on explicit verbal skills.

The model of high-context and low-context cultures offers a popular framework in intercultural communication studies but has been criticized as lacking empirical validation.

== History of differing context cultures ==
These concepts were first introduced by the anthropologist Edward T. Hall in his 1959 book The Silent Language. Cultures and communication in which the context of the message has great importance to structuring actions are referred to as high context. High-context defines cultures that are usually relational and collectivist, and which most highlight interpersonal relationships. Hall identifies high-context cultures as those in which harmony and the well-being of the group are preferred over individual achievement. In low-context cultures, members' communication must be more explicit, direct, and elaborate because individuals are not expected to have knowledge of each other's histories or backgrounds, and communication is not necessarily shaped by long-standing relationships between speakers. Because low-context communication concerns more direct messages, the meaning of these messages is more dependent on the words being spoken rather than on the interpretation of more subtle or unspoken cues. Low-context communication relies more on said words to convey meaning than it does on more nuanced or unsaid indications. This is because spoken words are more straightforward in nature.

A 2008 meta-analysis concluded that the model was "unsubstantiated and underdeveloped".

== Characteristics of high-context and low-context cultures ==
=== Denotation and connotation ===
High-context cultures are related to connotation. People within high-context cultures tend to be more aware and observant of facial expressions, body language, changes in tone, and other aspects of communication that are not directly spoken. Denotation tends to be attributed to low-context culture. In low-context cultures, people communicate more directly by explicitly stating what they want to communicate.

=== Interpersonal relationships ===
Individualism and collectivism are related to low-context and high-context cultures, respectively. Within high-context cultures, people rely on their networks of friends and family, viewing their relationships as part of one large community. In low-context cultures, relationships are not viewed as important figures to identity. People within low-context cultures see their relationships much looser and the lines between networks of people are more flexibly drawn.

=== Interaction ===
When people from different cultures and communication styles work together, misunderstandings and conflicts can arise. Low-context communicators might seem distant or unfriendly to those from high-context societies, while high-context communicators might appear pushy or impolite.

Understanding whether a culture is high or low can dramatically improve communication effectiveness. In high-context cultures, where much of the communication is implicit, knowing the context allows individuals to pick up on non-verbal cues and indirect messages, thus facilitating smoother interactions. Conversely, in low-context cultures, recognizing the need for explicit communication helps in providing clear and direct information, which can avoid misunderstandings. This understanding is relevant to global business environments, which benefit from clear communication.

== Examples of higher- and lower-context cultures ==
Cultural contexts are not absolutely "high" or "low". Instead, a comparison between cultures may find communication differences to a greater or lesser degree. Typically a high-context culture will be relational, collectivist, intuitive, and contemplative. They place a high value on interpersonal relationships and group members are a very close-knit community. Typically a low-context culture will be less close-knit, and so individuals communicating will have fewer relational cues when interpreting messages. Therefore, it is necessary for more explicit information to be included in the message so it is not misinterpreted. Not all individuals in a culture can be defined by cultural stereotypes, and there will be variations within a national culture in different settings. For example, Hall describes how Japanese culture has both low- and high-context situations. However, understanding the broad tendencies of predominant cultures can help inform and educate individuals on how to better facilitate communication between individuals of different cultural backgrounds.

Although the concept of high- and low-context cultures is usually applied in the field of analyzing national cultures, it can also be used to describe scientific or corporate cultures or specific settings such as airports or law courts. A simplified example mentioned by Hall is that scientists working in "hard science" fields (like chemistry and physics) tend to have lower-context cultures: because their knowledge and models have fewer variables, they will typically include less context for each event they describe. In contrast, scientists working with living systems need to include more context because there can be significant variables which impact the research outcomes.

Croucher's study examines the assertion that culture influences communication style (high/low-context) preference. Data was gathered in India, Ireland, Thailand, and the United States where the results confirm that "high-context nations (India and Thailand) prefer the avoiding and obliging conflict styles more than low-context nations (Ireland and the United States), whereas low-context nations prefer the uncompromising and dominating communication style more than high-context nations."

Individuals and groups operating in low context cultures are quite explicit and elaborate without having prior knowledge of each member's history or background, and tend to take what is said literally and prefer to have thorough knowledge before a task or a meeting.

In addition, Hall identified Japanese, Arabs, and Southern European peoples as high-context, but Germans, Scandinavians and other Northern Europeans, and Americans as low-context.

Cultures and languages are defined as higher or lower contexts on a spectrum. For example, it could be argued that the Canadian French language is a higher context than Canadian English, but a lower context than Spanish or French French. An individual from Texas (a higher-context culture) may communicate with a few words or use of a prolonged silence characteristic of Texan English, whereas a New Yorker would be very explicit (as typical of New York City English), although both speak the same language (American English) and are part of a nation (the United States of America) which is lower-context relative to other nations. Hall notes a similar difference between Navajo-speakers and English speakers in a United States school.

An example of high-context communication is the practice of taarof in Iranian culture.

Hall proposed a "spectrum" of national cultures from "High-Context cultures" to "Low-Context Cultures."

Cultural context can also shift and evolve. For instance, a study has argued that both Japan and Finland (high-context cultures) are becoming lower-context with the increased influence of Western Europe and United States culture respectively.

== Case studies ==
=== US, China, and Korea ===
Kim Donghoon conducted a study to test the major aspects of high-context versus low-context culture concepts. The study collected three samples from different cultures - the US, China, and Korea - with 96 business managers surveyed in the American and Chinese samples and 50 managers in the Korean sample. According to Hall's theory, the Chinese and Korean samples represented higher-context cultures while the American sample represents a lower-context culture. The study tested 16 items, covering various aspects of the high-versus-low context concept, including social orientation, responsibility, confrontation, communication, commitment, and dealing with new situations.

The results show significant differences between the American, Chinese, and Korean samples on 15 out of 16 items, with 11 items significant at the .01 level, one at the .05 level, and three at the .10 level. The composite score also indicates a significant difference among the three samples at the .01 level. The American sample scored the lowest compared to the two "Oriental samples," which aligns with Hall's concept. Overall, this study provides further evidence to support the high versus low-context culture concepts with Chinese, Korean, and American participants. The study suggests that in high-context cultures, such as China and Korea, people tend to be more socially oriented, less confrontational, and more complacent with existing ways of living compared to people from low-context cultures like the US.

=== Sino-American Language through automobile advertisement ===
A study from 2019 found that due to the different cultural backgrounds of China and the United States, the use of language in automotive advertising varies a lot.

For example, Chinese automobile advertisements, which are found to belong to the high-context category, characterized by vagueness and implicitness. Much of the information is brought in the context of the publicity, that includes also shared history, relationships, and cultural norms/values (for example, Chinese poetry).

On the other hand, American automobile advertisements are categorized as low context, characterized by straightforwardness and frankness. This aligns with low-context cultures where communication is more explicit, direct, and elaborate.

=== Russia and Romania ===
A case study was done on 30 Romanian and 30 Russian employees, to compare high- and low-context cultures, and the results strongly suggested that Russia and Romania are both high-context cultures. The table shows the major differences and similarities between individual queries.

=== Mexico and the U.S. ===
This study is a result of a cross-cultural examination between students from the United States, a low-context culture, and Mexico, a high-context culture, to study the reasons people communicate in each culture. There were 225 Mexican participants from three different undergraduate universities in Mexico City and 447 participants from Kent State University in the U.S. The case study looked into culture shock experienced by Mexicans studying in the U.S. The hypotheses tested indicated the high-context culture in Mexico would provide different motives for communication when compared with the low-context culture of the U.S.

The results found that U.S. participants used communication for pleasure more often than Mexican participants. Pleasure, affection, and inclusion were the highest motives for communication in both cultures and control was the lowest for both cultures.

=== Brazil and Germany ===
A research, published in 2022, investigates how varying cultural communication styles impact the outcomes of social group divisions. By blending concepts from theories on group dynamics and cultural communication, Kathrin Burmann and Thorsten Semrau examined 54 teams in the banking sector in Germany (low-context culture) and Brazil (high-context culture). The study results show that in Germany, known for direct communication, social divisions often lead to task conflicts, harming team performance. However, in Brazil, where communication tends to be more indirect, they didn't observe the same negative consequences.

== Overlap and contrast between context cultures ==
The categories of context cultures are not totally separate. Both often take many aspects of the other's cultural communication abilities and strengths into account. The terms high- and low-context cultures are not classified with strict individual characteristics or boundaries. Instead, many cultures tend to have a mixture or at least some concepts that are shared between them, overlapping the two context cultures.

Ramos suggests that "in low context culture, communication members' communication must be more explicit. As such, what is said is what is meant, and further analysis of the message is usually unnecessary." This implies that communication is quite direct and detailed because members of the culture are not expected to have knowledge of each other's histories, past experiences, or backgrounds. Because low-context communication concerns more direct messages, the meaning of these messages is more dependent on the words being spoken rather than on the interpretation of more subtle or unspoken cues.

The Encyclopedia of Diversity and Social Justice states that "high context defines cultures that are relational and collectivist, and which most highlight interpersonal relationships. Cultures and communication in which context is of great importance to structuring actions are referred to as high context." In such cultures, people are highly perceptive of actions. Furthermore, cultural aspects such as tradition, ceremony, and history are also highly valued. Because of this, many features of cultural behavior in high-context cultures, such as individual roles and expectations, do not need much detailed or thought-out explanation.

According to Watson, "the influence of cultural variables interplays with other key factors – for example, social identities, those of age, gender, social class, and ethnicity; this may include a stronger or weaker influence." A similarity that the two communication styles share is its influence on social characteristics such as age, gender, social class, and ethnicity. For example, for someone who is older and more experienced within a society, the need for social cues may be higher or lower depending on the communication style. The same applies to the other characteristics in varied countries.

On the other hand, certain intercultural communication skills are unique for each culture and it is significant to note that these overlaps in communication techniques are represented by subgroups within social interactions or family settings. Many singular cultures that are large have subcultures inside of them, making communication and defining them more complicated than the low-context and high-context culture scale. The diversity within a main culture shows how the high and low scale differs depending on social settings such as school, work, home, and in other countries; variation is what allows the scale to fluctuate even if a large culture is categorized as primarily one or the other.

== Online ==
Punctuation marks and emojis are important tools in digital communication. High-context users actively embrace these tools to enhance their communication styles and contribute to the efficiency and meaning of digital interactions. In high-context cultures, where communication relies on implicit understanding and cultural cues, the use of tools reflects specific cultural norms. These tools, which can be interpreted differently across cultures, emphasize the need for clarity in cross-cultural digital interactions.

Such markers can express emotion. Adding an exclamation mark to a sentence ("Thank you!") can emphasize a sense of gratitude. Similarly, using a smiley emoji or emoticon, such as "Thank you :)", can add a friendly and cheerful tone to the message. In contrast, the use of a full stop can indicate a serious tone. In casual contexts this can imply sternness, impatience, or otherwise unfriendliness: "Don't be late." implies negative emotion more than "Don't be late"

Punctuation can clarify meaning. For example, "Come" and "Come!" can have different nuances. The use of an exclamation mark often indicates emphasis or positivity from the speaker.

== Miscommunication within cultural contexts ==
Between each type of culture context, there will be forms of miscommunication because of the difference in gestures, social cues, and intercultural adjustments; however, it is important to recognize these differences and learn how to avoid miscommunication to benefit certain situations. Since all sets of cultures differ, especially from a global standpoint where language also creates a barrier for communication, social interactions specific to a culture normally require a range of appropriate communication abilities that an opposing culture may not understand or know about. This significance follows into many situations such as the workplace, which can be prone to diversified cultures and opportunities for collaboration and working together. Awareness of miscommunication between high- and low-context cultures within the workplace or intercultural communication settings advocates for collected unification within a group through the flexibility and ability to understand one another.

=== How higher context relates to other cultural metrics ===
==== Diversity ====
Families, subcultures, and in-groups typically favor higher-context communication. Groups that are able to rely on a common background may not need to use words as explicitly to understand each other. Settings and cultures where people come together from a wider diversity of backgrounds such as international airports, large cities, or multi-national firms, tend to use lower-context communication forms.

==== Language ====
Hall links language to culture through the work of Sapir-Whorf on linguistic relativity. A trade language will typically need to explicitly explain more of the context than a dialect which can assume a high level of shared context. Because a low-context setting cannot rely on a shared understanding of potentially ambiguous messages, low-context cultures tend to give more information or to be precise in their language. In contrast, a high-context language like Japanese, Chinese, or Korean can use a high number of homophones but still be understood by a listener who knows the context.

==== Elaborated and restricted codes ====
The concept of elaborated and restricted codes was introduced by sociologist Basil Bernstein in his book Class, Codes and Control. The use of an elaborated code indicates that the speaker and listener do not share significant amounts of common knowledge, and hence they may need to "spell out" their ideas more fully: elaborated codes tend to be more context-independent. In contrast, the use of restricted codes indicates that speakers and listeners do share a great deal of common background and perspectives, and hence much more can be taken for granted and thus expressed implicitly or through nuance: restricted codes tend to be more context-dependent.

Restricted codes are commonly used in high-context culture groups, where group members share the same cultural background and can easily understand the implicit meanings "between the lines" without further elaboration. Conversely, in cultural groups with low context, where people share less common knowledge or 'value individuality above group identification', elaborated codes are necessary to avoid misunderstanding.

==== Collectivism and individualism ====
The concepts of collectivism and individualism have been applied to high- and low-context cultures by Dutch psychologist Geert Hofstede in his Cultural Dimensions Theory. Collectivist societies prioritize the group over the individual, and vice versa for individualist ones. In high-context cultures, language may be used to assist and maintain relationship-building and to focus on process. India and Japan are typically high-context, highly collectivistic cultures, where business is done by building relationships and maintaining respectful communication.

Individualistic cultures promote the development of individual values and independent social groups. Individualism may lead to communicating to all people in a group in the same way, rather than offering hierarchical respect to certain members. Because individualistic cultures may value cultural diversity, a more explicit way of communicating is often required to avoid misunderstanding. Language may be used to achieve goals or exchange information. The USA and Australia are typically low-context, highly individualistic cultures, where transparency and competition in business are prized.

==== Stability and durability of tradition ====
High-context cultures tend to be more stable, as their communication is more economical, fast, efficient, and satisfying; but these are gained at the price of devoting time to preprogramming cultural background, and their high stability might come with a price of a high barrier for development. By contrast, low-context cultures tend to change more rapidly and drastically, allowing extension to happen at faster rates. This also means that low-context communication may fail due to the overload of information, which makes culture lose its screening function.

Therefore, higher-context cultures tend to correlate with cultures that also have a strong sense of tradition and history, and change little over time. For example, Native Americans in the United States have higher-context cultures with a strong sense of tradition and history, compared to general American culture. Focusing on tradition creates opportunities for higher-context messages between individuals of each new generation, and the high-context culture feeds back to the stability hence allowing the tradition to be maintained. This is in contrast to lower-context cultures in which the shared experiences upon which communication is built can change drastically from one generation to the next, creating communication gaps between parents and children, as in the United States.

==== Facial expression and gesture ====
Culture also affects how individuals interpret other people's facial expressions. An experiment performed by the University of Glasgow shows that different cultures have different understanding of the facial expression signals of the six basic emotions, which are the so-called "universal language of emotion"—happiness, surprise, fear, disgust, anger and sadness. In high-context cultures, facial expressions and gestures take on greater importance in conveying and understanding a message, and the receiver may require more cultural context to understand "basic" displays of emotions.

==== Marketing and advertising perspective ====
Cultural differences in advertising and marketing may also be explained through high- and low-context cultures. One study on McDonald's online advertising compared Japan, China, Korea, Hong Kong, Pakistan, Germany, Denmark, Sweden, Norway, Finland, and the United States, and found that in high-context countries, the advertising used more colors, movements, and sounds to give context, while in low-context cultures the advertising focused more on verbal information and linear processes. While a low-context approach might be more successful in cultures with direct communication styles, a high-context marketing strategy might be more beneficial in cultures where communication is indirect and largely dependent on context.

==== Website communication ====
Website design among cross-cultural barriers includes factoring in decisions about culture-sensitive color meanings, layout preferences, animation, and sounds. In a case study conducted by the IT University of Copenhagen, it was found that websites catering to high-context cultures tended to have more detailed and advanced designs, including various images and animations. Low-context websites had less animation and more stagnant images, with more details on information. The images found on the websites used in the study promoted individualistic and collectivist characteristics within the low-context and high-context websites, respectively. The low-context websites had multiple images of individuals, while the high-context websites contained images and animations of groups and communities.

==== AI blindness to cultural nuances ====
In a study measuring how well AI systems reproduce the intricate Iranian cultural practice of taarof noted that the AI system completely miss the cues that govern interactions of Persian-speakers, which can "derail negotiations, damage relationships, and reinforce stereotypes,”

== Limitations of the model ==
In a 2008 meta-analysis of 224 articles published between 1990 and 2006, Peter W. Cardon wrote:

[T]he theory was never described by Hall with any empirical rigor, and no known research involving any instrument or measure of contexting validates it. ... Ironically, contexting is most frequently discussed in terms of directness, yet empirical studies nearly all fail to support this relationship. In other words, the relationship between directness and contexting based on traditional classifications of [high-context] and [low-context] cultures is particularly tenuous. Most of the context categories simply have not been researched enough to make firm conclusions. But the fact that contexting has not been empirically validated should not necessarily be construed as a failure of the theory. ... Nonetheless, the contexting model simply cannot be described as an empirically validated model.

== See also ==
- Phatic expression
- Taarof
