= Subtext =

Aspect of communication that is not explicitly announced

In any communication, in any medium or format, "subtext" is the underlying or implicit meaning that, while not explicitly stated, is understood by an audience.

The Oxford English Dictionary defines it as "an underlying and often distinct theme in a conversation, piece of writing, etc.", while according to Merriam-Webster, subtext is "the implicit or metaphorical meaning (as of a literary text)".

These definitions highlight that subtext involves themes or messages that are not directly conveyed, but can be inferred.

== About subtext ==
Subtext is content "sub" i.e. "under" (with the sense of "hidden beneath") the verbatim wording; readers or audience must "gather" subtext "reading between the lines" or inferring meaning, a process needed for a clear and complete understanding of the text. A meaning stated explicitly is, by definition not subtext (for lack of hiding), and writers may be criticized for failure artfully to create and use subtext; such works may be faulted as too "on the nose", with the characters meaning what they literally have said, undermining dramatic tension, and leaving the work too prosaic.

Subtext also may be included in the action of narratives, with secondary themes expressed in order to appeal to a general audience. Such approaches to sexual or otherwise more adult story-content, in works accessible to the young, often fails to "register" for the young reader, though adults will catch the child-invisible nuances.

== Formats for creating subtext ==
Below are the main types of subtext that are used in film:

- Have a character comment on an aspect of another person's relationship which is present in the relationship of the people in the current conversation.
- Body language communicates subtext. Body language is often used to convey whether a character is welcoming or threatening.
- Implied accusations, often communicated through leading questions, are a form of subtext. For example, when a lawyer asks you "what were you doing on the night of the 23rd", that is an implied accusation.
- Facial expressions and voice tone express many things including discontent and suspicion. For example, a quiet one-word answer to a question implies that the speaker is lying and that they do not want to say the true answer.
- The subtext of how much people care for each other can be communicated by showing the amount of care, interest, and attentiveness people have for each other's opinions, desires, and character traits.

Linguistic implicature studies the kinds of subtext that are often used within language itself. Ernest Hemingway utilized subtext in his works.

The modern concept of subtext in acting was developed significantly by Russian theatre practitioner Konstantin Stanislavski, who popularized the idea of unspoken intentions and internal motivations beneath dialogue.

== See also ==
- Concision – Writing principle of eliminating redundancy
- Connotation – Cultural or emotional association
- Dramatic irony – Literary and rhetorical device or general attitude towards life
- Iceberg theory – Writing technique coined by American writer Ernest Hemingway
- Innuendo – Suggestive remark
- Implication – Information conveyed verbally yet not literally
- Meta-communication – Communication about how information is meant to be interpreted
- Pragmatics – Branch of linguistics and semiotics relating context to meaning
- Speech act – Utterance that serves a performative function
- Stanislavski's system – System to train actors
- Steganography – Hiding messages in other messages
