= Kinesics =

Interpretation of body motion communication

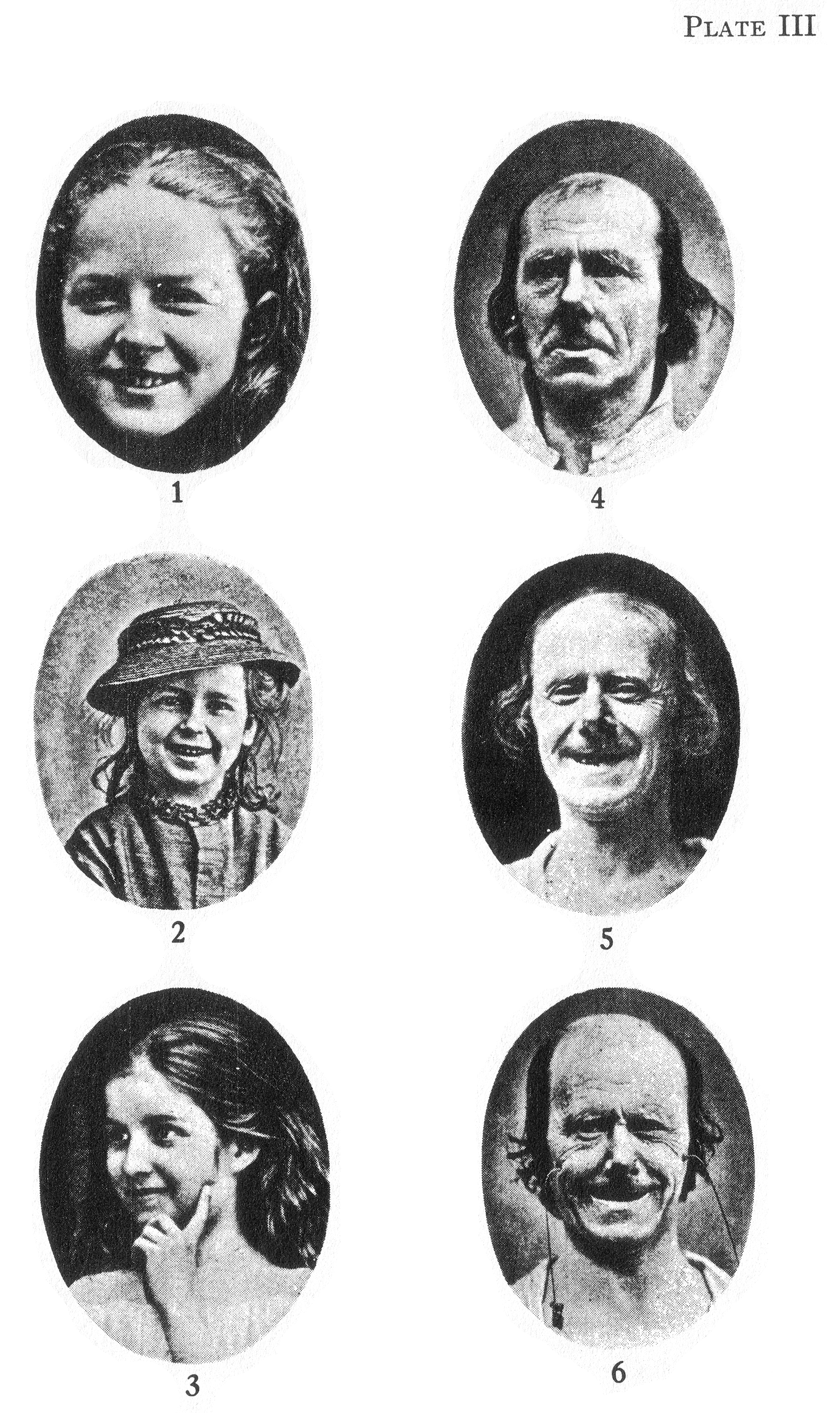
Charles Darwin's The Expression of the Emotions in Man and Animals

Kinesics is the interpretation of body communication such as facial expressions and gestures, nonverbal behavior related to movement of any part of the body, or the body as a whole. The equivalent popular culture term is body language, a term Ray Birdwhistell, considered the founder of this area of study, neither used nor liked (on the grounds that what can be conveyed with the body does not meet the linguist's definition of language).

== Birdwhistell's work ==
The term "kinesics" was first used in 1952 by anthropologist Ray Birdwhistell, who wanted to study how people communicate through posture, gesture, stance and movement. His ideas over several decades were synthesized and resulted in the book Kinesics and Context. Interest in kinesics specifically and nonverbal behaviour generally was popularized in the late 1960s and early 1970s by such popular mass-market (nonacademic) publications as How to Read a Person Like a Book. Part of Birdwhistell's work involved filming people in social situations and analyzing them to show elements of communication that were not seen otherwise. One of his most important projects was The Natural History of an Interview, a long-term interdisciplinary collaboration including Gregory Bateson, Frieda Fromm-Reichmann, Norman A. McQuown, Henry W. Brosin and others.

Drawing heavily on descriptive linguistics, Birdwhistell argued that all movements of the body have meaning and that nonverbal behaviour has a grammar that can be analyzed in similar terms to spoken language. Thus, a "kineme" is "similar to a phoneme because it consists of a group of movements which are not identical, but which may be used interchangeably without affecting social meaning."

Birdwhistell estimated that no more than 30 to 35 percent of the social meaning of a conversation or an interaction is carried by the words. He also concluded that there were no universals in these kinesic displays, a claim that was disputed by Paul Ekman, who was interested in analysis of universals, especially in facial expression.

== Modern applications ==
In a current application, kinesic behavior is sometimes used as signs of deception by interviewers looking for clusters of movements to determine the veracity of the statements being uttered, although kinesics can be equally applied in any context and type of setting to construe innocuous messages whose carriers are silent or unable to express verbally.

Relevant concepts include:

- Emblems - Body movements or gestures that are directly translatable into a word or phrase
- Illustrators - Accompany or reinforce verbal messages
  - Batons - Temporally accent or emphasize words or phrases
  - Ideographs - Trace the paths of mental journeys
  - Deictic movements - Point to a present object
  - Kinetographs - Depict a bodily action
  - Spatial movements - Depict a spatial relationship
  - Pictographs - Draw a picture of their referent
  - Rhythmic movements - Depict the rhythm or pacing of an event
- Affect Displays - Show emotion
- Regulators - Control the flow and pace of communication
- Manipulators - Release physical or emotional tension

Kinesic behaviors are an important part of nonverbal communication. Body movements convey information, but interpretations vary by culture. As many movements are carried out at a subconscious or at least a low-awareness level, kinesic movements carry a significant risk of being misinterpreted in an intercultural communication situation.

== See also ==
- Intercultural competence
- Metacommunicative competence
- Nonverbal communication
  - Body language
  - Cold reading
  - Eye contact
  - Facial expression
  - Gesture
  - Posture
  - Proxemics
- Paralanguage
