= Vrij =

Vrij or De Vrij may refer to:

- Aldert Vrij, Dutch psychologist
- Dick Vrij, Dutch mixed martial artist
- James Vrij (born 1951), Dutch boxer
- Stefan de Vrij (born 1992), Dutch footballer

== See also ==
- Vrij Nederland, a Dutch magazine
- Het Vrije Woord (disambiguation), two Dutch-language newspapers
