= Statement analysis =

Pseudoscientific investigation technique

Statement analysis, also called scientific content analysis (SCAN), is a pseudoscientific technique for analyzing the words people use to try to determine if what they said is accurate. Proponents claim this technique can be used to detect concealed information, missing information, embedded confessions and whether the information that person has provided is true or false.

Multiple empirical studies have found SCAN techniques to be unreliable at correctly separating true and false statements. SCAN is generally not accepted by courts and has been described as a form of pseudoscience.

== About ==
Related to statement analysis is a different technique for analyzing the words people use called "statement validity assessment" (SVA). The SVA is a tool that was originally designed to determine the credibility of child witnesses testimonies in trials for sexual offences. The "criteria-based content analysis" (CBCA) is a core component of the SVA and is a tool used to distinguish true statements from false statements as CBCA scores are expected to be higher for truth tellers than liars. A qualitative review of the CBCA analyzed 37 studies, strong support for the tool was established as truth tellers obtained significantly higher CBCA scores compared to the liars. More recently, a meta-analytic review found CBCA criteria to be a valid technique for discriminating between memories of real self-experienced events and invented or false accounts.

Countries such as The Netherlands, Germany and Sweden use these techniques as scientific evidence in court. However, countries such as the United States, Canada and the UK do not consider these techniques as legally valid evidence in court. Studies have raised serious questions and concerns about the validity of CBCA for assessing the credibility of children's testimonies. One study using 114 children showed that CBCA scores were higher for the group of children describing a familiar event compared to the group of children describing an unfamiliar event. The potential influence of familiarity on CBCA scores raises concerns about the validity of the tool for assessing credibility in children.

It has also been noted that the error rate of CBCA in the laboratory is high, that the error rate of SVA in practice is unknown and that the methodology continues to be disputed among the scientific community. In conclusion, there is still great controversy surrounding the use of the SVA and many studies have investigated its core component, the CBCA, in order to determine its validity and reliability. More research is needed to conclude whether or not the information obtained from these tests should be admissible in court.

== Example ==
Statement analysis involves an investigator searching for linguistic cues and gaps in a subject's testimony or preliminary statements. Ideally, the technique would guide investigators to ask follow-up questions to uncover discrepancies. The creator of Scientific Content Analysis (SCAN), Avinoam Sapir, gives the example of someone saying, "I counted the money, put the bag on the counter, and proceeded to go home." Sapir says the statement was literally true:

He counted the money (when you steal you want to know how much you are stealing), and then the subject put the bag on the counter. The subject didn't say that he put the money back in the bag after counting it, because he didn't; he left the empty bag on the counter and walked away with the money.

Sapir says that a fundamental principle of statement analysis is that "denying guilt is not the same as denying the act. When one says 'I am not guilty' or 'I am innocent,' they are not denying the act; they are only denying guilt." Sapir claims that it is almost impossible for a guilty person to say "I didn't do it." He asserts that guilty people tend to speak in even greater circumlocutions by saying things like "I had nothing to do with it" or "I am not involved in that".

== Criticism ==
Aldert Vrij, one of the leading authorities on detection of deception (DOD) techniques, points out that most studies of the technique did not rely on the ground truth being established and thus examiners could not be certain if "examinees were actually telling the truth or lying". He also notes that there is no standardization among the different methods of analysis and this "implies that much depends on the subjective interpretation and skill of the individual" performing the analysis. Vrij attributes this to an absence of theoretical underpinning behind SCAN/statement analysis. Vrij characterizes SCAN/statement analysis as weaker than CBCA because SCAN/statement analysis lacks "a set of cohesive criteria", being instead "a list of individual criteria". Vrij argues that SCAN/statement analysis is best used as a technique to guide investigative interviews rather than as a "lie detection tool".

Subsequent empirical studies have concurred with these findings, finding that SCAN/statement analysis techniques are applied inconsistently and are not reliable at detecting deceptive statements. The use of SCAN techniques has also been found to be vulnerable to contextual bias on the part of investigators.

Critics argue that the technique encourages investigators to prejudge a suspect as deceptive and affirm a presumption of guilt before the interrogation process has even begun. Statement analysis in general has been criticized as "theoretically vague" with little or no empirical evidence in its favor, and SCAN in particular has been characterized as "junk science" with the Skeptic's Dictionary and Skeptical Inquirer magazine classifying it as a form of pseudoscience. In 2016, the High-Value Detainee Interrogation Group (HIG), a federal agency group consisting of the FBI, the CIA, and the United States Department of Defense, released a report which found that studies commonly cited in favor of SCAN were scientifically flawed and that SCAN's evaluative criteria did not withstand scrutiny in laboratory testing.

== See also ==
- Body language
- Discourse analysis
- Nonverbal communication
- Voice stress analysis
