= FMRI lie detection =

Lie detection method with functional MRI

fMRI lie detection is a field of lie detection using functional magnetic resonance imaging (fMRI). FMRI looks to the central nervous system to compare time and topography of activity in the brain for lie detection. While a polygraph detects anxiety-induced changes in activity in the peripheral nervous system, fMRI purportedly measures blood flow to areas of the brain involved in deception.

== History ==
Psychiatrist and scientific researcher Daniel Langleben was inspired to test lie detection while he was at Stanford University studying the effects of a drug on children with attention deficit disorder (ADD). He found that these children have a more difficult time inhibiting the truth. He postulated that lying requires increased brain activity compared to truth because the truth must be suppressed, essentially creating more work for the brain. In 2001, he published his first work with lie detection using a modified form of the Guilty Knowledge Test, which is sometimes used in polygraph tests. The subjects, right-handed, male college students, were given a card and a Yes/No handheld clicker. They were told to lie to a computer asking questions while they underwent a brain scan only when the question would reveal their card. The subjects were given $20 for participating, and told they would receive more money if they deceived the computer; however, none did.

His studies showed that the inferior and superior prefrontal and anterior cingulate gyri and the parietal cortex showed increased activity during deception. In 2002, he licensed his methods for lie detection to the No Lie MRI company located in San Diego, California.

== Working ==
As "Prospects of fMRI as a Lie Detector" states, fMRIs use electromagnets to create pulse sequences in the cells of the brain. The fMRI scanner then detects the different pulses and fields that are used to distinguish tissue structures and the distinction between layers of the brain, matter type, and the ability to see growths. The functional component allows researchers to see activation in the brain over time and assess efficiency and connectivity by comparing blood use in the brain, which allows for the identification of which portions of the brain are using more oxygen, and thus being used during a specific task. This is called the blood-oxygen-level-dependent (BOLD) hemodynamic response.

FMRI data have been examined through the lens of machine learning algorithms to decode whether subjects believed or disbelieved statements, ranging from mathematical, semantic to religious belief statements. In this study, independent component features were used to train the algorithms, achieving up to 90% accuracy on predicting a subjects response, when prompted to indicate with a button press whether they believed or disbelieved a given assertion.

== Brain activation ==
Activation of BA 40, the superior parietal lobe, the lateral left MRG, the striatum, and left thalamus was unique to truth while activation of the precuneus, posterior cingulate gyrus, prefrontal cortex, and cerebellum will be used to show a similar network for truth and lie. The most brain activity occurs in both sides of the prefrontal cortex, which is linked to response inhibition. This indicates that deception may involve inhibition of truthful responses. Overall bilateral activation occurs in deception in the middle frontal gyrus, parahippocampal gyrus, the precuneus, and the cerebellum. When looking into the different styles of lying we see differentiation in the locations of activation. Spontaneous lies require retrieval from the semantic and episodic memory to be able to quickly formulate a viable situation that remains in working memory while visual images are created to further hide the truth. The areas associated with this retrieval, the ventrolateral prefrontal cortex, anterior prefrontal cortex, and precuneus, are activated as well as the dorsolateral prefrontal cortex, anterior cingulate, and posterior visual cortex are activated. The anterior cingulate cortex is used for cross-checking and probability. For well-rehearsed, memorized, and coherent lies episodic memory activation is needed. This creates increased activation in the right anterior prefrontal cortex, BA 10, and the precuneus. The Parahippocampal cortex may be used in this process to generalize lies to situations because no cross-checking is needed. Newer studies have considered the salience of lying in a variety of situations. If a lie is of lower salience activation is broader and general while salient lies have specific activation in regions associated with inhibition and selection. Many areas are much more active in lying than truth possibly meaning its harder to retrieve false information compared to true memories because truth has more encoded retrieval cues. Interestingly, the limbic system, which is involved in many different emotional responses including the sympathetic nervous system, is not activated in deception.

== Legality ==
Historically, fMRI lie detector tests have not been allowed into evidence in legal proceedings, the most famous attempt being Harvey Nathan's insurance fraud case in 2007. This pushback from the legal system may be based on the 1988 Federal Employment Polygraph Protection Act that acts to protect citizens from incriminating themselves and the right to silence. The legal system specifically would require many more studies on the negative false rate to decide if the absence of deception proves innocence. The lack of legal support has not stopped companies like No Lie MRI and CEPHOS from offering private fMRI scans to test deception.

There is potential to use fMRI evidence as a more advanced form of lie detection, particularly in identifying the regions of the brain involved in truth telling, deception, and false memories. False memories are a barrier in validating witness testimonies. Research has shown that when presented a list of semantically related words, participant recollection can often be unintentionally false and additive of words that were not originally present. This is a normal psychological occurrence, but presents numerous problems to a jury when attempting to sort out the facts of a case.

fMRI imaging is also being used to analyze brain activity during intentional lies. Findings have shown that the dorsolateral prefrontal cortex activates when subjects are pretending to know information, but that the right anterior hippocampus activates when a subject presents false recognition in contrast to lying or accurately telling a truth. This indicates that there may be two separate neural pathways for lying and false memory recall. However, there are limitations to how much brain imaging can distinguish between truths and deceptions because these regions are common areas of executive control function; It is difficult to tell if the activation seen is due to the lie told, or something unrelated.

Future research aims to differentiate between when someone has genuinely forgotten an experience and when someone has made an active choice to withhold or fabricate information. Developing this distinction to the point of scientific validity would help discern when defendants are being truthful about their actions and when witnesses are being truthful about their experiences.

== Pros and cons ==
While fMRI studies on deception have claimed detection accuracy as high as 90% many have problems with implementing this style of detection. At a basic level administering, fMRIs is extremely difficult and costly. Only yes or no answers can be used which allows for flexibility in the truth and style of lying. fMRI requires the participant to remain still for long periods and little movements can create issues with the scan. Some people are unable to take one such as those with medical conditions, claustrophobia, or implants. When looking at deception specifically, there is little research on non-compliant individuals. The criminal justice system interacts with many types of criminals that are not often taken into account in fMRI studies such as addicts, juveniles, mentally unstable, and the elderly. Studies have been done on Chinese individuals and their language and cultural differences did not change results, as well as a study (S. Spence 2011) on that 52 schizophrenic patients, 27 of whom were experiencing delusions at the time of the study. While these studies are promising, the lack of extensive research on the populations that would be most affected by fMRIs being admitted into the legal system is a huge drawback. As well, fMRI deception tests look only at changes in activity in the brain which similarly to the polygraph does not show directly that lying is occurring. If dealing with complex styles of lying or questions the need for a control condition is critical to differentiate from other higher emotional states unrelated to deception. Some studies, such as Ganis et al.., have shown that it is possible to fool an fMRI by learning countermeasures.
