= Ronald P. Fisher =

American psychology professor

Ronald Philip Fisher
- Other name: Ron Fisher R.P. Fisher Ronald Fisher
- Occupation: Professor of Psychology

Academic background
- Education: Ph. D. from Ohio State University

Academic work
- Discipline: Psychologist
- Sub-discipline: Memory, Cognitive Interviewing, Lie Detection
- Institutions: UCLA, University of Toronto, Florida International University

Ronald P. Fisher is a psychological researcher who is best known for his work on developing the cognitive interview technique. Fisher is also widely known for his research on the theoretical and applied aspects of memory and his research on lie detection. He is a professor of psychology at Florida International University, which is located in Miami, Florida. At the time of this article Fisher has been cited on Researchgate over 12,000 times with over 146,000 reads.

== Education ==
Ronald Fisher received his Ph.D. in psychology from Ohio State University. Since then, he has served in academic roles at both the University of California, Los Angeles (UCLA) and the University of Toronto.

== Career ==
=== Academic positions ===
Fisher is currently a professor of psychology at Florida International University, but has previously been employed by both UCLA and the University of Toronto.

=== Community outreach ===
Fisher has worked closely with many notable agencies, such as the Federal Bureau of Investigation and the National Transportation Safety Board. He has conducted workshops at both of these agencies regarding the cognitive interview technique.

In addition to these organizations, Fisher has also worked extensively with both domestic and international agencies including the National Aeronautics and Space Administration (NASA), the United States Army, the United States Navy, the Israeli Air Force, the British police, and the Australian police in order to help expand the use of the cognitive interview technique.

=== Editorial work ===
Fisher is an editor of the Journal of Applied Research in Memory and Cognition. He was also previously a member of the Planning and Technical Working Groups of the United States Department of Justice. While on this committee, he was tasked with developing the national guidelines for collecting eyewitness evidence.

== Research ==
Fisher's main research focus has been helping develop the cognitive interview technique. The cognitive interview technique is widely used in law enforcement, as this technique is aimed at increasing eyewitness recall. Fisher has collaborated with numerous other prominent psychologists when developing the cognitive interview technique, including R. Edward Geiselman. This technique was fully introduced in a book the two co-authored titled Memory Enhancing Technique for Investigative Interviewing: The Cognitive Interview. He has also worked with a number of other well known psychologists regarding other topics including Aldert Vrij and Sharon Leal.

This specialized interview technique is designed to facilitate a more comprehensive and reliable memory recall, all while making sure to decrease the likelihood of producing false information. The cognitive interview works by having the eyewitness first reinstate the context that they were in when they witnessed the crime happen. The interview questions are then asked in varying order, so that as much memory interference is prevented as possible. Another key aspect of this technique is asking the eyewitness to describe the crime from different viewpoints, so that the eyewitness is able to create as complete of a report as possible. Fisher and Geiselman have compared this interviewing technique with other methods such as hypnosis, and have found that its results are extremely comparable.

The cognitive interview technique is steadily growing in popularity throughout the United States, and even internationally as well. Fisher has hosted various workshops with agencies such as the Federal Bureau of Investigation, National Aeronautics and Space Association, and the Department of Justice. In addition, Fisher has also collaborated with police departments in Britain, the Air Force in Israel, and police departments in Australia to educate them on the cognitive interview technique.

The cognitive interview technique has been applied to many important contexts outside of forensic settings. Some examples include palliative care, intellectual disability, and gerontology.

In addition to the research done on the cognitive interview and interviewing witnesses, Fisher has also assisted with copious research on verbal deception detection, which is more commonly known as lie detection. More specifically, Fisher examines how concepts such as cognitive load and nonverbal communication are related to detecting deception.

Fisher has 164 publications many of which are accessible on websites such as APA.org, sagehub.com, Wiley.com, and Researchgate.net. Many of his publications focus on the aspects of memory. He has contributed to several publications that cover the validity of lie detection methods used by law enforcement including a publication over the efficacy of SCAN. His most cited publications revolve around the detection of deception which include: Increasing Cognitive Load to Facilitate Lie Detection: The Benefit of Recalling an Event in Reverse Order, Detecting Deception by Manipulating Cognitive Load, and Outsmarting the Liars: The Benefits of Asking Unanticipated Questions.

== Books ==
- Fisher, R. P., Geiselman, R. E. (1992). Memory-Enhancing Techniques for Investigative Interviewing: The Cognitive Interview. United States: Thomas.
