= Decubitis =

Decubitis may refer to:

- Lying (position), a type of human position in which the body is more or less horizontal
- Pressure ulcer, localised damage to the skin and/or underlying tissue that usually as a result of usually long-term pressure
