= Body language =

Type of nonverbal communication

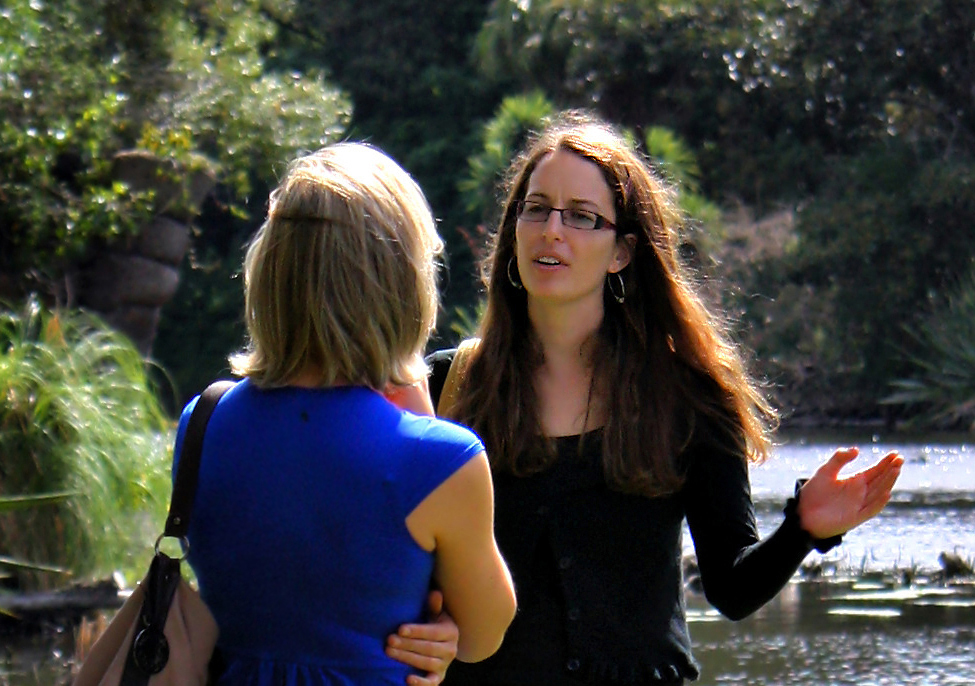
Two women talking to each other. Notice the woman in blue has an arm next to her body, the other uses hers to gesticulate; both are signs of body language.

Body language is a type of nonverbal communication in which physical behaviors, as opposed to words, are used to express or convey information.

Such behavior includes facial expressions, body posture, gestures, eye movement, touch and the use of space. Although body language is an important part of communication, most of it happens without conscious awareness. In social communication, body language often complements verbal communication. Nonverbal communication has a significant impact on doctor-patient relationships, as it affects how open patients are with their doctor.

As an unstructured, ungrammatical, and broadly-interpreted form of communication, body language is not a form of language. It differs from sign languages, which are true languages with complex grammar systems and exhibiting the fundamental properties considered to exist in all languages.

Some researchers conclude that nonverbal communication accounts for the majority of information transmitted during interpersonal interactions. It helps to establish the relationship between two people and regulates interaction, yet it can be ambiguous. The interpretation of body language tends to vary in different cultural contexts. Within a society, consensus exists regarding the accepted understandings and interpretations of specific behaviors. However, controversy exists on whether body language is universal. The study of body language is also known as kinesics.

== Evolutionary origins of body language ==
Body language was one of the oldest forms of communication between primates. Nonverbal communication in the form of gestures, facial expressions, and postures is also used in the transmission of ideas without using words. Studies show that in non-human primates, such as chimpanzees and bonobos gestures are not only instinctive but also learned through social interactions.This development is known as ontogenetic ritualization. The same applies to humans, for instance, raising an arm constitutes a sign to start a wrestling game. This gesture, with constant practice, served as a form of communication between people.

Nonverbal communication in non-human primates, as in human primates, evolved based on a common evolutionary foundation. Even if it is more complex in humans. From an early age, humans develop body language through gestures, facial expressions, and postures for communication of feelings or to catch attention of something. They employ these non-verbal methods for more significant meanings and emotional content. In contrast, research indicates that in some primates, such gestures are used more frequently for immediate responses and are often more of a reaction in a more concrete context.

== Physical expressions ==
=== Facial expressions ===
Facial expression is an important part of body language and the expression of emotion. It can comprise movement of the eyes, eyebrows, lips, nose and cheeks.

At one point, researchers believed that making a genuine smile was nearly impossible to do on command. More recently, however, a study conducted by researchers at Northeastern University found that people could convincingly fake a Duchenne smile, even when they were not feeling especially happy.

The action of the pupil corresponds to mood and communicates the mood of a person when observed. Research has found that people have no control over their pupils, which involuntarily expand when expressing interest in another person or when looking at something. Normally, eyes instinctively blink at around 20 times per minute, but looking at a person the viewer finds attractive can make this rate faster.The eyes can communicate information that words may not be able to, the intensity and duration of eye contact can determine someone's intentions depending on the setting. Studies also show that during social exchanges, the eyes, which are used to send messages to others without words, work as a relay for the brain itself, with the need to process and interpret information. Variations in pupil size respond to cognitive and affective stimuli and therefore give instant clues about a person's understanding of a situation. Such pupillary changes also allow the identification of an individual's mental or emotional state. According to the academic researcher Deepika, in the workplace, strong eye contact is usually translated as sincerity and open communication. Furthermore, there are instances where people use closed communication, which refers to when people seem resistant to communication, for example, the avoidance of eye contact or crossed arms are interpreted as lack of interest regardless of whether it is intentional or subconscious.

Studies and behavioral experiments have shown that facial expressions and bodily expressions are congruent in terms of conveying visible signs of a person's emotional state, and that emotions can be judged with a high level of accuracy based on facial expressions. At the same time, the brain processes another person's facial and bodily expressions simultaneously.

=== Head and neck postures and signals ===
The movement of the head can indicate various intentions and messages, and is often culture and context-dependent.

The angle of facing and positioning of a person's head can be indicative of their mood, when considered along with patterns of muscular tension that occur concurrently at the face and neck. (Note: For example, the posture of the body has a corresponding pattern of muscle tension i.e. how muscles in the face and neck are contracted or relaxed while the person's head is tilted. This relationship is instinctively observed in conjunction with a person's posture. Men and women have been found to be perceived differently in regard to this relationship between posture and muscle tension. According to Alain Mignault and Avi Chaudhuri and considered in regard to smiling: Indeed, a bowed head probably leads raters to perceive the contraction of the Zygomatic Major (Action Unit 12) and a raised head to perceive the contraction of the Triangularis (Action Unit 15). Second, although we found no significant difference in the perception of mouth contraction at zero degrees between male and female actors, a large difference is perceived at other head angles even though the expression itself is fixed. Such a correspondence can be deliberately manipulated to produce different effects. For example, an actor can pose in a confident manner, while relaxing muscles in the neck which would ordinarily be more contracted in conjunction with the pose. He may thereby make it appear that he is actually afraid and the pose is merely an attempt to appear confident.) Tilting the head up may demonstrate 'superiority emotions' such as self-assurance, pride, or contempt. When it is tilted down, this may indicate 'inferiority emotions' such as shame, shyness, or respect. Nonetheless, the accuracy of such interpretation depends on the intensity of the feeling or other context-related factors. For instance, feelings of contentment may instead feature the head being angled down somewhat.

In many cultures, nodding of the head is considered a sign of saying 'yes', while shaking the head is usually interpreted as meaning 'no'. In India, a head bobble is the tilting of the head from side to side, whose interpretation can be ambiguous and context-dependent.

A tilting of the head to the side can be an expression of interest in what the other person is communicating. It may be a sign of curiosity, uncertainty, or questioning. If the head is propped up by the hand when the head is tilted then this may indicate disinterest or be a sign of thinking about something. A head that is tilted forwards slightly while being pulled backward may indicate being suspicious.

As a person's vocal chords are influenced physically by the tilt of their head and the respective pattern of muscle tension, it is possible to discern their head tilt by listening to how they talk. Head angle and movement have a large impact on the amplitude and pitch of one's speech.

=== General body postures ===
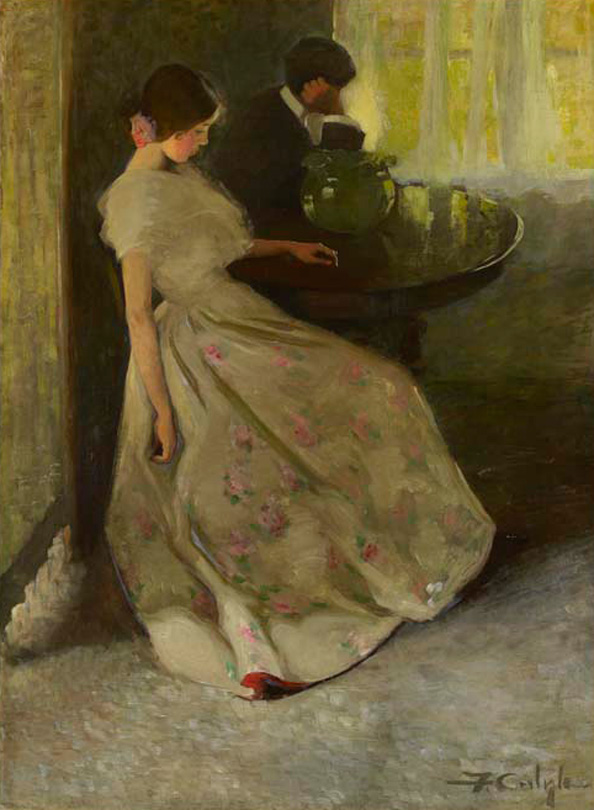
The Tiff, a painting by Canadian artist Florence Carlyle (c. 1902)

Emotions can also be detected through body postures. Research has shown that body postures are more accurately recognized when an emotion is compared with a different or neutral emotion. For example, a person feeling angry would portray dominance over the other, and their posture would display approach tendencies. Comparing this to a person feeling fearful: they would feel weak, and submissive and their posture would display avoidance tendencies.

Sitting or standing postures can also indicate one's emotions. A person sitting still in the back of their chair, leaning forward with their head nodding along with the discussion implies that they are open, relaxed and generally ready to listen. On the other hand, a person who has their legs and arms crossed with the foot kicking could imply that they are feeling impatient and emotionally detached from the discussion.

In a standing discussion, a person standing with arms akimbo (hands resting on their hips) with feet pointed towards the speaker could suggest that they are attentive and interested in the conversation. A person standing to give a speech or presentation may plant their feet and press them firmly into the ground in order to convey a sense of stability and confidence to the audience. In a physically confrontational situation, it may also be a sign of aggression. In sport, planting the feet is associated with subsequent physical action i.e. a boxer plants their feet before throwing a punch.

While many people attribute bodily posture purely to individual expression, there is evidence that points to posture as a product of cultural norms. For example, standing with arms akimbo in Western countries may signify a confident but relaxed mood, however, in Bali it is considered rude and may send signals of aggression.

==== Chest ====
In general, the relative fullness or shallowness of the chest, especially around the sternum, can be a key indicator of both mood and attitude.

When the body language of the chest is assessed in everyday circumstances, it involves an instinctive assessment of these factors of shape and volume. When the posture of the chest is fuller, and it is positioned relatively forward, then this is a sign of confidence. If it is thrusting prominently forward, then this may be an indication that the person wants to be socially prominent and make a statement of physical confidence. When the chest is pulled back then this can indicate a less confident attitude.

If a person positions their chest closer towards another person it may be a sign of paying closer attention to them as part of a conversation, or, in other circumstances, it may be a sign of physical assertion and aggression.

==== Gestures ====
Gestures are movements made with body parts and may be voluntary or involuntary. Gestures can be used to convey various messages about what someone is thinking or feeling. Gestures can even be used to produce language, such as sign language.

Arm gestures can be interpreted in several ways. In a discussion, when one stands, sits or even walks with folded arms, it is normally not a welcoming gesture. It could mean that they have a closed mind and are most likely unwilling to listen to the speaker's viewpoint. Another type of arm gesture also includes an arm crossed over the other, demonstrating insecurity and a lack of confidence. Hand gestures often signify the state of well-being of the person making them. Relaxed hands indicate confidence and self-assurance, while clenched hands may be interpreted as signs of stress or anger. If a person is wringing their hands, this demonstrates nervousness and anxiety.

Finger gestures are also commonly used to exemplify one's speech as well as denote the state of well-being of the person making them. In certain cultures, pointing using one's index finger is deemed acceptable. However, pointing at a person may be viewed as aggressive in other cultures – for example, people who share Hindu beliefs consider finger pointing offensive. Instead, they point with a palm up open hand. Likewise, the thumbs up gesture could show "OK" or "good" in countries like the United States, South Africa, France, Lebanon and Germany. But this same gesture is insulting in other countries like Iran, Bangladesh and Thailand, where it is the equivalent of showing the middle finger in some cultures.

It is difficult to distinguish a behavior motivated by an out-group bias—a negative response to a member of a different group—from one fueled by stereotype effect—a cognitive association between members of a specific out-group and a culturally held belief. Some behaviors are unique to some cultures, which leads to the outgroup having a harder time decoding the information, these interactions could lead to out-group bias. An example of a cultural difference in non-verbal communication is between Americans and the Greek. Americans nod up and down to indicate "yes" while they nod side to side to indicate "no". On the other hand, the Greek nod upwards to indicate "no" and downwards to indicate "yes". During American Greek interactions, the cultures clash and have a harder time decoding the non-verbal cues.

Another way that out-group bias could be created is through low and high contact cultures. Low contact cultures are more individualistic, while high contact cultures are collectivistic. Low contact cultures express mostly verbally, and use less of the non-verbal cues, while high contact cultures use both forms of communication at the same time. People from low contact cultures could face a hard time decoding the gestures from those of high contact cultures, this can lead to out-group bias.

=== Handshakes ===
Handshakes are regular greeting rituals and commonly used when meeting, greeting, offering congratulations, expressing camaraderie, or after the completion of an agreement. Research has shown that handshakes can improve the accuracy of first impressions, particularly in judging conscientiousness, especially among men. In negotiations, handshakes promote cooperative behavior and lead to better outcomes in both integrative and distributive scenarios. Negotiators who shake hands are more likely to openly reveal their preferences and craft fairer agreements.

Studies have categorized several handshake styles, including the finger squeeze, the bone crusher (shaking hands too strongly), the limp fish (shaking hands too weakly), etc. Handshakes are popular in the United States and are appropriate for use between men and women. However, in Muslim cultures, men may not shake hands or touch women in any way and vice versa. Likewise, in Hindu cultures, Hindu men may never shake hands with women. Instead, they greet women by placing their hands as if praying.

A firm, friendly handshake has long been recommended in the business world as a way to make a good first impression, and the greeting is thought to date to ancient times as a way of showing a stranger you had no weapons.

=== Breathing ===
Breathing is not just an automatic vital act. While most people tend to feel that breathing is automatic, the process is governed by an intricate neural control system called the breathing central pattern generator (bCPG), which involves interactions with brain regions that communicate with regions involved in feelings and cognition. Stress and anxiety make breathing faster or irregular, for instance. This physiological link helps to explain some aspects of body language, including breaths and breathing patterns that can be a signal of a person's mood and state of mind. Researchers also study this link, because studying how breathing interacts with emotional regulation and cognition may reduce stress or enhance therapeutic practice. Breathing also plays a huge role in conversation because it provides air that powers speech. Breathing provides rapid shallow inhalations that prolong speech and provide control over one's speech.

=== Gait ===
Gait refers to how a person walks or runs. Body language and gait is usually considered in regard to walking because any concurrently given social signs are ordinarily more pronounced when a person is walking as opposed to when they are running. Similarly to standing postures, a person's walking gait can be directly indicative of their mood. If a person is walking with their head bowed, their shoulders slumped and with a heavy, deenergised step then this typically means that they are feeling sad or unhappy about something. On the other hand, if they are walking with their head up, shoulders level or back, and stepping lightly then this ordinarily indicates that they are in a happier and more confident mood. In scientific studies of the relationship between gait and body language, one of the key measurements used is how light or heavy someone is on their feet. Untrained participants instinctively understand that it relates to states of positivity and negativity respectively.

A cultural perception of how someone being light on their feet is an indicator of their mood, is demonstrated through expressions such as spring in their step and walking on air which emphasise that someone is in a positive emotional state i.e. they are happy or elated about something. This cultural awareness finds further expression in acting whereby actors manipulate how light or heavy they are on their feet in order to represent themselves as being in different moods. This helps to develop their character to the audience and demonstrate the emotional significance of any social interactions that they are involved in. Such presentations may be supported by other adjustments to the actor's gait in order to emphasize a particular mood. For example, walking with the head hung low, the body bent forward, and the shoulders dropped can all build upon an impression of sadness.

A gait which involves the firmer and more forceful placement of the feet may convey an impression of increased physical confidence in general, aggression, or be a sign of anger. This type of gait is distinct from the heavy footed gait associated with sadness.

=== Joints ===
A person's body language, and their respective emotional state, is represented by the action of the joints of their body. Such action incorporates both their alignment and positioning. This in turn influences their range of movement which is known as joint amplitude. The greater the amplitude, the greater the range of movement. Different emotional states have different joint amplitudes. For example, a person who is angry has a greater level of joint amplitude than someone who is sad. This is reflected in their gait where their hip flexion (the raising of the knee towards the torso) is greater. Similarly, a person who is joyful will have greater levels of pelvis rotation than someone who is content.

== Other subcategories ==
=== Oculesics ===
Oculesics, a subcategory of body language, is the study of eye movement, eye behavior, gaze, and eye-related nonverbal communication.

As a social or behavioral science, oculesics is a form of nonverbal communication focusing on deriving meaning from eye behavior. It shows how eye movement and attention can show emotions and interest that help regulate conversations, but is mostly based on culture. Oculesics is culturally dependent. For example, in traditional Anglo-Saxon culture, avoiding eye contact usually portrays a lack of confidence, certainty, or truthfulness. However, in the Latino culture, direct or prolonged eye contact means that you are challenging the individual with whom you are speaking or that you have a romantic interest in the person. Also, in many Asian cultures, prolonged eye contact may be a sign of anger or aggression. In South Asia children are expected to lower their gaze at elders as a form of respect. In many islamic countries prolonged eye contact can be seen as inappropriate and it is customary for men and women to lower their gaze when interacting with each other.

=== Haptics ===
Research has also shown that people can accurately decode distinct emotions by merely watching others communicate via touch. It shows how people use physical contact such as a hug, or a pat on the back, to show emotions and establish relationship and send social cues. A study by Jones and Yarbrough regarded communication with touch as the most intimate and involving form which helps people to keep good relationships with others. For example, Jones and Yarbrough explained that strategic touching is a series of touching usually with an ulterior or hidden motive thus making them seem to be using touch as a game to get someone to do something for them.

Heslin outlines five haptic categories:

- Functional/professional: This expresses task-orientation.
- Social/polite: This expresses ritual interaction.
- Friendship/warmth: This category is about affection and closeness between friends. Touches are often unique to specific relationships, for example, inside jokes or frequent gestures shared with friends. These behaviors communicate trust and emotional warmth, but do not carry the romantic or sexual connotations found in other categories
- Love/intimacy: This expresses emotional attachment. Public touch can serve as a 'tie sign' that shows others that your partner is "taken". When a couple is holding hands, putting their arms around each other, this is a 'tie sign' showing others that they are together. The use of 'tie signs' are used more often by couples in the dating and courtship stages than between their married counterparts.
- Sexual/arousal: This expresses sexual intent.

=== Proxemics ===
A chart depicting Edward T. Hall's interpersonal distances of man, showing radius in feet and meters

Another notable area in the nonverbal world of body language is that of spatial relationships, which is also known as proxemics. Introduced by Edward T. Hall in 1966, proxemics is the study of measurable distances between people as they interact with one another. Hall came up with four distinct zones in which most people operate:

Intimate distance for embracing, touching or whispering

Close phase – less than 6 inches (15 cm)
Far phase – 6 to 18 inches (15 to 46 cm)

Personal distance for interactions among good friends or family members

Close phase – 1.5 to 2.5 feet (46 to 76 cm)
Far phase – 2.5 to 4 feet (76 to 122 cm)

Social distance for interactions among acquaintances

Close phase – 4 to 7 feet (1.2 to 2.1 m)
Far phase – 7 to 12 feet (2.1 to 3.7 m)

Public Distance used for public speaking

Close phase – 12 to 25 feet (3.7 to 7.6 m)
Far phase – 25 feet (7.6 m) or more.

In addition to physical distance, the level of intimacy between conversants can be determined by "socio-petal socio-fugal axis", or the "angle formed by the axis of the conversants' shoulders".

Changing the distance between two people can convey a desire for intimacy, declare a lack of interest, or increase/decrease domination. It can also influence the body language that is used. For example, when people talk they like to face each other. If forced to sit side by side, their body language will try to compensate for this lack of eye-to-eye contact by leaning in shoulder-to-shoulder.

As with other types of body language, proximity range varies with culture. Hall suggested that "physical contact between two people ... can be perfectly correct in one culture, and absolutely taboo in another".

== Tone of voice ==
Certain body postures can significantly influence the tone of voice. The intra-abdominal pressure (IAP) is a direct influence on, and discernible in, tone of voice. Pitch, intonation, speed, and volume impact the way messages are decoded. The pitch of someone's voice can be interpreted in different ways, a high-pitched voice is associated with excitement, while a low voice is associated with seriousness. The intonation of a statement can help people determine if a claim is being made or if a question is being asked. Statements with a rising intonation are usually questions. The speed and volume at which someone speaks helps determine the emotion behind the statement. For example, a loud-quick paced tone of voice is associated with urgency and anger, on the other hand, a slow-soft voice is associated with calmness and tenderness.

== Attitude ==
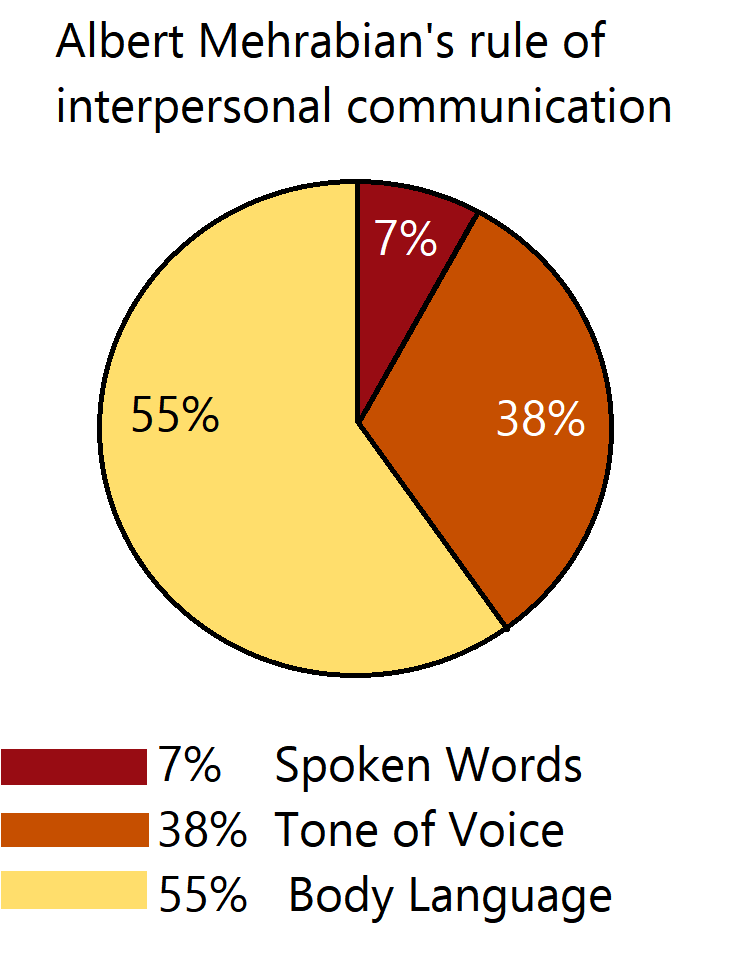
Mehrabian's rule

Human communication is extremely complex and one must look at the whole in order to make any determination as to the attitudes being expressed.

Body language is a major contributor to the attitude a person conveys to others. Albert Mehrabian maintains that during a conversation dealing with feelings and attitudes (i.e., like-dislike), 7% of what is communicated is via what is said, 38% is via tone of voice, and the majority, 55%, is via body language. This is also referred to as the '7%–38%–55% Rule', and is often considered in studies of human communications. While there is a wider debate about the percentage share which should be attributed to each of the three contributing factors, it is generally agreed upon that body language plays a fundamental role in determining the attitude a person conveys.

A person may alter their body language in order to alter the attitude they convey; this may in turn influence the rapport they have with another person. Whether a formal or informal attitude is conveyed may influence the other person's response.

== Trust ==
Body language which expresses trust will usually convey a sense of openness and warmth. Contrarily, mistrusting body language will appear relatively closed and cold. Body language which conveys a sense of trust can vary depending on the nature of the relationship.

Nonverbal communication has a significant impact on doctor-patient relationships, as it affects how open patients are with their doctor. Having open body language, which is typically identified as having a relaxed posture, nodding, eye contact can contribute to patients having higher levels of trust with their doctors. According to, W.Y. Kee, patients who had a doctor that avoided eye contact by looking at a screen or had negative facial expressions contributed to patients feeling dissatisfied after their visit.

The way body language is expressed changes depending on the gender and age of the person. Women and men express body language differently, especially in the workplace, women tend to express more intense nonverbal cues than men, this makes the cues easier to decode. These nonverbal signals impact the way men and women interact in the workplace, as according to Deepika, women tend be highly comfortable being close and communicating with other women. This is hypothesized to be the case because people that demonstrate similar nonverbal cues can interpret and decode communication signals more effectively.

=== Business ===
Body language which conveys trust in a business context is done so in a formal manner and in line with business etiquette. In the world of business, the power structures that tend to exist are communicated non-verbally. Nonverbal dominance refers to how people communicate power, control, and authority using gestures, posture, facial expressions, and voice. Nonverbal dominance becomes important in these business settings because it could impact sales and business relationships. For example, 'adaptors' refers to touching an object or oneself during a conversation or presentation. These communicate nervousness and uncertainty, which contributes to a lower rate of persuasiveness, this can lead to lower sales.

Some examples of how people decode nonverbal dominance are silence, loud voices, and a non-smiling face. The study carried out by Burgoon demonstrated how participants could use nonverbal cues better to understand each other during a game of mafia. During the game, the participants had to take on different roles (spies or villagers) which had various levels of authority, as a result, participants adapted their body language to the role they played in the game. The study demonstrated that the spies were less dominant and more trustworthy, while the leader of the group was more dominant and demonstrated this dominance through their loud voice and upright posture. Overall, the study was able to demonstrate a correlation between the participants' role and how they adapted their body language to match the level of dominance.

=== Friendship ===
Body language between friends is typically more expressive and informal than body language in business. In casual settings, people display a lack of dominance more casually. For example, they may show more expressive facial expressions, nodding, and hand gestures. These nonverbal cues display open-body language, which contributes to improved communication among friends. These displays of body language may increase trust between friends, as nonverbal and verbal communication work together to form a clearer message. Body language in friendships can sometimes mean certain handshakes or gestures towards one another. It may also correlate to some sort of meaning for a certain idea or thing.

=== Intimate relationships ===
The body language of trust in intimate relationships such as marriage and long term relationships is usually open and extremely personalized, even if it is not a physical dynamic that is displayed in friendships. In the west holding hands is a common gesture among romantic partners and it shows trust and communication between both partners. There are other forms of body language such as caressing and kissing, it can also serve to show openness and warmth in a distinctly personal manner. Through these gestures, you can tell when the partners are comfortable with each other, and a willingness to allow greater physical closeness than be acceptable in other types of relationships. Such patterns of body language are often established gradually over the course of courtship and are context-specific, meaning they cannot be appropriately transferred to non-intimate interaction.

When people are in an intimate relationship, they often position themselves closer to each other than if they were in a different kind of relationship. Even though it may only be a small distance closer together, an observer can interpret this additional closeness to mean that they are in an intimate relationship. For example, spouses may sit, stand, and walk in each other's intimate space, whereas business colleagues may maintain more of a distance and outside of each other's intimate space. As the spouses are in an intimate relationship, they do not feel the need to maintain the same distance as the business colleagues.

== Readiness ==
When you get onto a basketball court, all your teammates beside you, pumped up and ready to go, you form impressions of the other side, their strength and unity, their mood and body language. Of course the physicality element is stronger in sport, but something similar happens in politics, where you can read the mood of one side or the other simply by looking at them, sitting there all together.

Body language can signal when the body is ready and to take action which may be categorized as either 'readiness for physical exertion' or 'readiness for social interaction. Although individuals are usually prepared for both of these, body language reflects the area for which they are usually ready at a given moment.These states of readiness can influence the entire body including, tone of voice, posture, and the impression conveyed to others. When readiness feels increased it can be associated with high energy or intensity, deeper breathing, heightened nervous system activity, and a higher heart rate. There can also be physiological changes that can extend to the skin, which can appear fuller and more tense in states of readiness, and thinner or more flaccid when readiness is reduced. In cases of physical readiness, such effects are usually more noticeable in both intensity and visibility

=== Readiness for social interaction ===
Harvard professor Amy Cuddy suggested in 2010 that two minutes of power posing – "standing tall, holding your arms out or toward the sky, or standing like Superman, with your hands on hips" – could increase confidence, but retracted the advice and stopped teaching it after a 2015 study was unable to replicate the effect.

== Recovery ==
The body language of recovery indicates that someone is recovering after a period of action or stress. It gives a distinct impression even though the actual position of the body may be similar to other forms of body language. In general terms, it involves the recovering of energy and may additionally include the regaining of breath and a general sense of balance and equilibrium. For example, during a speech a speaker may pause to allow the audience to consider what they have just said and also to rest. It may be a short pause after a sentence or a longer pause after speaking for several minutes. They may continue to stand in a confident way but they will not be gesticulating with their hands anymore. They may sway slightly and adjust the positioning of their bodyweight over their feet but they will not move around energetically.

Muscle tension and joint amplitude are two of the main ways that relative states of exertion, stress and recovery can be ascertained. A person who is recovering will have more relaxed muscles and looser joints than someone who is exerting themselves or who is stressed. In the latter case, their muscles and joints will have become too tight giving them a deenergised, tense and possibly hunched appearance. Cases of stress are frequently caused by a lack of recovery. Overall, a person who is recovering will appear more open and relaxed. If they are with other people then this typically also indicates that they are more comfortable being around them. It can show a greater level of trust and personal connection. For example, a person with their family will be more likely to exhibit the body language of recovery than if they were with their boss, when they would be expected to have more work focused body language. This does not mean that they do not recover at work but that there is more of an emphasis on taking some form of action. As the body language of recovery can demonstrate a more intimate connection between people it can also indicate a romantic relationship. For example, if a man and woman are shown to be recovering together it can be suggestive that they are in a romantic relationship as they are more willing to be open and relaxed with each other. And vice versa if they are shown to have more of a work based attitude in each others company, then this indicates that they are less likely to be in a romantic relationship.

Specific forms of body language which show someone is resting may include resting the head on the hand or leaning back in a chair. Depending on the context, it may not always be appropriate. For example, resting the chin on one fist may indicate thinking but is too restful a pose for a business meeting.

== Universal vs. culture-specific ==
Scholars have long debated on whether body language, particularly facial expressions, are universally understood. In Darwin's evolutionary theory, he postulated that facial expressions of emotion are inherited. On the other hand, scholars have questioned if culture influences one's bodily expression of emotions. Broadly, the theories can be categorized into two models: the cultural equivalence model and cultural advantage model.

=== Cultural equivalence model ===
The cultural equivalence model predicts that "individuals should be equally accurate in understanding the emotions of ingroup and outgroup members". This model is rooted in Darwin's evolutionary theory, where he noted that both humans and animals share similar postural expressions of emotions such as anger/aggression, happiness, and fear. These similarities support the evolution argument that social animals (including humans) have a natural ability to relay emotional signals with one another, a notion shared by several academics (Chevalier-Skolnikoff, 1974; Linnankoski, Laakso, Aulanko, & Leinonen, 1994). Where Darwin notes similarity in expression among animals and humans, the Cultural Equivalence Model notes similarity in expression across cultures in humans, even though they may be completely different.

One of the strongest pieces of evidence that supports this model was a study conducted by Paul Ekman, where members of a preliterate tribe in Papua New Guinea reliably recognized the facial expressions of individuals from the United States. Culturally isolated and with no exposure to US media, there was no possibility of cross-cultural transmission to the Papuan tribesmen.

The term body language is usually applied in regard to people but may also be applied to animals.

=== Cultural advantage model ===
On the other hand, the cultural advantage model predicts that individuals of the same race "process the visual characteristics more accurately and efficiently than other-race faces". Other factors that increase accurate interpretation include familiarity with nonverbal accents.

There are numerous studies that support both the cultural equivalence model and the cultural advantage model, but reviewing the literature indicates that there is a general consensus that seven emotions are universally recognized, regardless of cultural background: happiness, surprise, fear, anger, contempt, disgust, and sadness.

Recently, scholars have shown that the expressions of pride and shame are universal. Tracy and Robins (2008) concluded that the expression of pride includes an expanded posture of the body with the head tilted back, with a low-intensity face and a non-Duchenne smile (raising the corner of the mouth). The expression of shame includes the hiding of the face, either by turning it down or covering it with the hands.

== Applications ==
Body language is usually regarded as an involuntary and unconscious aspect of communication. However in some contexts it can be deliberately to make use of, both in performance and interpretation, to serve a specific purpose. Interest in body language has also grown commercially, there have been books and guides published to instruct consciously interpret nonverbal cues and apply them advantageously in different situations.

The use of body language can be seen in a wide variety of fields. Body languages has seen applications in instructional teaching in areas such as second-language acquisition and also to enhance the teaching of subjects like mathematics. A related use of body language is as a substitution to verbal language to people who lack the ability to use that, be it because of deafness or aphasia. Body language has also been applied in the process of detecting deceit through micro-expressions, both in law enforcement and even in the world of poker.

=== Instructional teaching ===
==== Second-language acquisition ====
The importance of body language in second-language acquisition was inspired by the fact that to successfully learn a language is to achieve discourse, strategic, and sociolinguistic competencies. Sociolinguistic competence includes understanding the body language that aids the use of a particular language. This is usually also highly culturally influenced. As such, a conscious ability to recognize and even perform this sort of body language is necessary to achieve fluency in a language beyond the discourse level.

The importance of body language to verbal language use is the need to eliminate ambiguity and redundancy in comprehension. Pennycook (1985) suggests to limit the use of non-visual materials to facilitate the teaching of a second language to improve this aspect of communication. He calls this being not just bilingual but also 'bi-kinesic'.

==== Enhancing teaching ====
Body language can be a useful aid not only in teaching a second language, but also in other areas. The idea behind using it is as a nonlinguistic input. It can be used to guide, hint, or urge a student towards the right answer. This is usually paired off with other verbal methods of guiding the student, be it through confirmation checks or modified language use. Tai in his 2014 paper provides a list of three main characteristic of body language and how they influence teaching. The features are intuition, communication, and suggestion.

- The intuitive feature of body language used in teaching is the exemplification of the language, especially individual words, through the use of matching body language. For example, when teaching about the word "cry", teachers can imitate a crying person. This enables a deeper impression which is able to lead to greater understanding of the particular word.
- The communicative feature is the ability of body language to create an environment and atmosphere that is able to facilitate effective learning. A holistic environment is more productive for learning and the acquisition for new knowledge.
- The suggestive feature of body language uses body language as a tool to create opportunities for the students to gain additional information about a particular concept or word through pairing it with the body language itself.

=== Detecting deceit ===
==== Law enforcement ====
There is no scientific evidence that non-verbal cues can reliably detect deception (lie detection). The approach also has been broadly rejected by the scholarly community, yet some law enforcement agencies still use it. The Federal Bureau of Investigation, for example, has published several Law Enforcement Bulletins describing body language as a tool for evaluating truthfulness and detecting deception.

There has been the suggestion that the body language of members of law enforcement might influence the accuracy of eyewitness accounts.

==== Poker ====
The game of poker involves the competence of reading and analyzing the body language of opponents (for example, poker tells), and moderating one's own body language (for example, poker bluff).

=== Visual arts ===
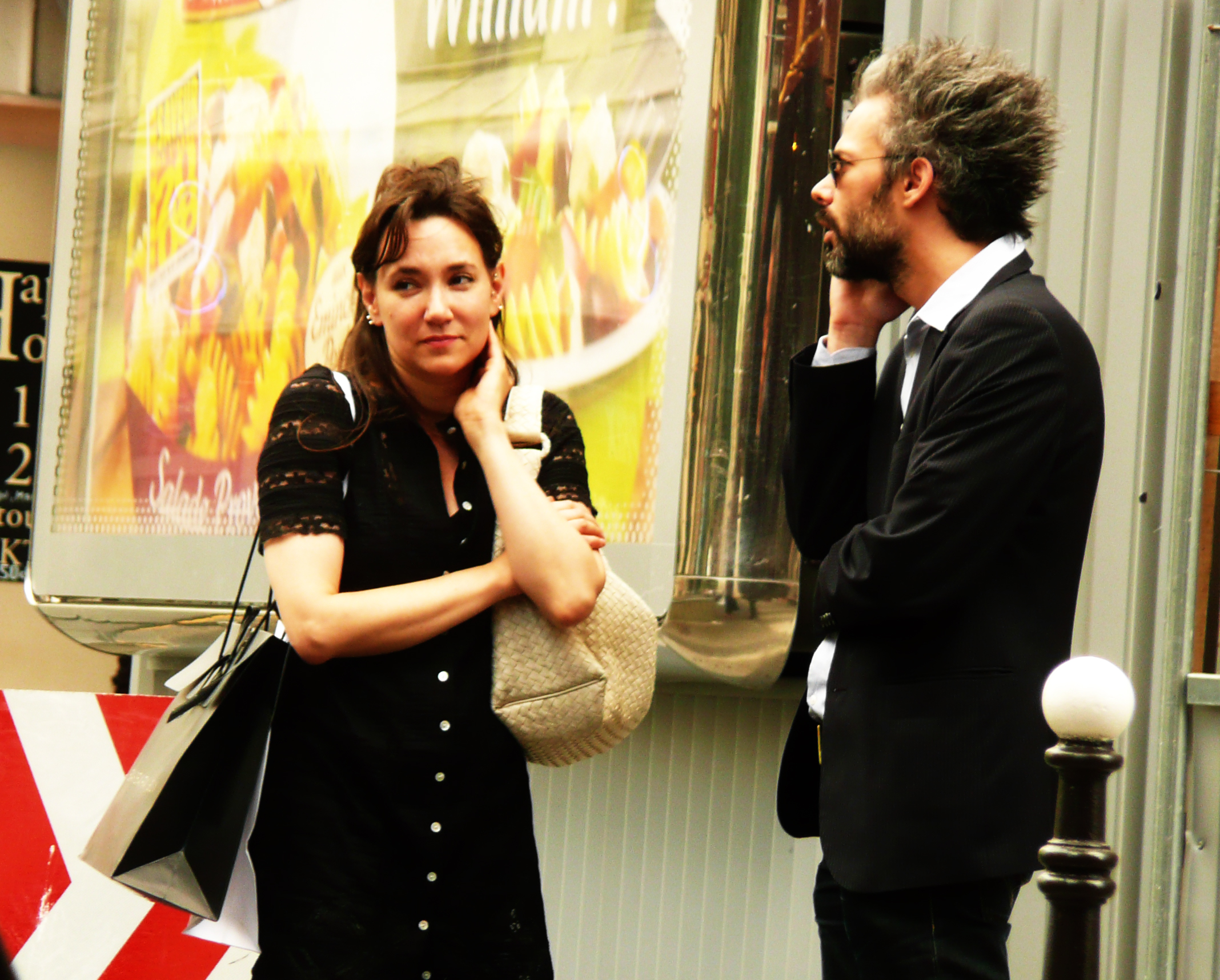
Folding your arms and looking away, in body language, can be interpreted as insecurity. The exaggerated use of the gesture by both characters is used to create a comedic impression.

Exaggerated, repetitious, and inappropriate body language is often used to achieve a humorous effect in comedy productions. Comedy double acts often use methods of complementary and contrasting comedic body language.

== Kinesics ==
Kinesics is the study and interpretation of nonverbal communication related to the movement of any part of the body or the body as a whole. It was first developed by Ray Birdwhistell, who disavowed use of the term body language, as it did not meet the linguistic definition of language.

Birdwhistell pointed out that "human gestures differ from those of other animals in that they are polysemic, that they can be interpreted to have many different meanings depending on the communicative context in which they are produced". And, he "resisted the idea that 'body language' could be deciphered in some absolute fashion". He also indicated that "every body movement must be interpreted broadly and in conjunction with every other element in communication".

== Sports ==
Research on body language (nonverbal behavior, NVB) in sport is only slowly emerging, although it is considered important and has been frequently studied in other disciplines. NVB plays a crucial role in sports by conveying athletes' emotions, intentions, and psychological states. Research indicates that athletes' NVBs, such as facial expressions and postures, are correlated with internal factors like emotions and contextual variables like success. Observers, including opponents and referees, can interpret these NVBs, which can influence perceptions and decisions during competition.

== See also ==
- Autism spectrum
- Computer processing of body language
- Display rules
- Facial Action Coding System (FACS)
- Imitation
- Literal and figurative language
- Metaphor
- Mimoplastic art
- Mirror neuron
- Nonverbal learning disorder
- Smiley
- Statement analysis
- Universal language
