= Science in classical antiquity =

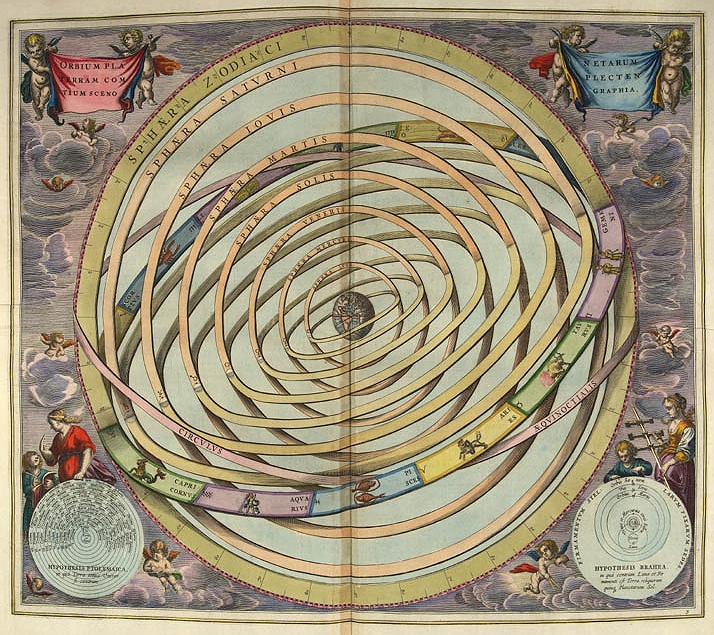
The Ptolemaic system of celestial motion as depicted in the Harmonia Macrocosmica (1661)

Science in classical antiquity encompasses inquiries into the workings of the world or universe aimed at both practical goals (e.g., establishing a reliable calendar or determining how to cure a variety of illnesses) as well as more abstract investigations belonging to natural philosophy. Classical antiquity is traditionally defined as the period between the 8th century BC (beginning of Archaic Greece) and the 6th century AD (after which there was medieval science). It is typically limited geographically to the Greco-Roman West, Mediterranean basin, and Ancient Near East, thus excluding traditions of science in the ancient world in regions such as China and the Indian subcontinent.

Ideas regarding nature that were theorized during classical antiquity were not limited to science but included myths as well as religion. Those who are now considered as the first scientists may have thought of themselves as natural philosophers, as practitioners of a skilled profession (e.g., physicians), or as followers of a religious tradition (e.g., temple healers). Some of the more widely known figures active in this period include Hippocrates, Aristotle, Euclid, Archimedes, Hipparchus, Galen, and Ptolemy. Their contributions and commentaries spread throughout the Eastern, Islamic, and Latin worlds and contributed to the birth of modern science. Their works covered many different categories including mathematics, cosmology, medicine, and physics.

== Classical Greece ==
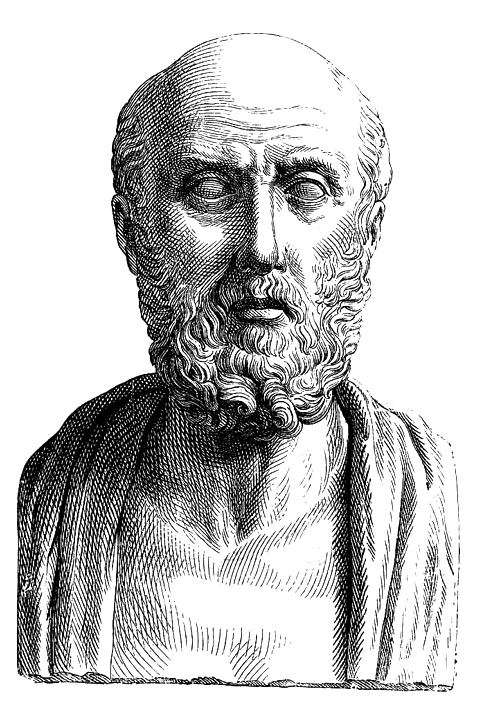
The physician Hippocrates, known as the "Father of Modern Medicine"

=== Knowledge of causes ===
This subject inquires into the nature of things first began out of practical concerns among the ancient Greeks. For instance, an attempt to establish a calendar is first exemplified by the Works and Days of the Greek poet Hesiod, who lived around 700 BC. Hesiod's calendar was meant to regulate seasonal activities by the seasonal appearances and disappearances of the stars, as well as by the phases of the Moon, which were held to be propitious or ominous. Around 450 BC we begin to see compilations of the seasonal appearances and disappearances of the stars in texts known as parapegmata, which were used to regulate the civil calendars of the Greek city-states on the basis of astronomical observations.

Medicine is another area where practically oriented investigations of nature took place during this period. Greek medicine was not the province of a single trained profession and there was no accepted method of qualification of licensing. Physicians in the Hippocratic tradition, temple healers associated with the cult of Asclepius, herb collectors, drug sellers, midwives, and gymnastic trainers all claimed to be qualified as healers in specific contexts and competed actively for patients. This rivalry among these competing traditions contributed to an active public debate about the causes and proper treatment of disease, and about the general methodological approaches of their rivals.

An example of the search for causal explanations is found in the Hippocratic text On the Sacred Disease, which deals with the nature of epilepsy. In it, the author attacks his rivals (temple healers) for their ignorance in attributing epilepsy to divine wrath, and for their love of gain. Although the author insists that epilepsy has a natural cause, when it comes to explain what that cause is and what the proper treatment would be, the explanation is as short on specific evidence and the treatment as vague as that of his rivals. Nonetheless, observations of natural phenomena continued to be compiled in an effort to determine their causes, as for instance in the works of Aristotle and Theophrastus, who wrote extensively on animals and plants. Theophrastus also produced the first systematic attempt to classify minerals and rocks, a summary of which is found in Pliny's Natural History.

The legacy of Greek science in this era included substantial advances in factual knowledge due to empirical research (e.g., in zoology, botany, mineralogy, and astronomy), an awareness of the importance of certain scientific problems (e.g., the problem of change and its causes), and a recognition of the methodological significance of establishing criteria for truth (e.g., applying mathematics to natural phenomena), despite the lack of universal consensus in any of these areas.

=== Pre-Socratic philosophy ===
==== Materialist philosophers ====
The four classical elements (fire, air, water, earth) of Empedocles illustrated with a burning log. The log releases all four elements as it is destroyed.

The earliest Greek philosophers, known as the pre-Socratics, were materialists who provided alternative answers to the same question found in the myths of their neighbors: "How did the ordered cosmos in which we live come to be?" Although the question is much the same, their answers and their attitude towards the answers is markedly different. As reported by such later writers as Aristotle, their explanations tended to center on the material source of things.

Thales of Miletus (624–546 BC) considered that all things came to be from and find their sustenance in water. Anaximander (610–546 BC) then suggested that things could not come from a specific substance like water, but rather from something he called the "boundless". Exactly what he meant is uncertain but it has been suggested that it was boundless in its quantity, so that creation would not fail; in its qualities, so that it would not be overpowered by its contrary; in time, as it has no beginning or end; and in space, as it encompasses all things. Anaximenes (585–525 BC) returned to a concrete material substance, air, which could be altered by rarefaction and condensation. He adduced common observations (the wine stealer) to demonstrate that air was a substance and a simple experiment (breathing on one's hand) to show that it could be altered by rarefaction and condensation.

Heraclitus of Ephesus (about 535–475 BC), then maintained that change, rather than any substance was fundamental, although the element fire seemed to play a central role in this process. Finally, Empedocles of Acragas (490–430 BC), seems to have combined the views of his predecessors, asserting that there are four elements (Earth, Water, Air and Fire) which produce change by mixing and separating under the influence of two opposing "forces" that he called Love and Strife.

All these theories imply that matter is a continuous substance. Two Greek philosophers, Leucippus (first half of the 5th century BC) and Democritus came up with the notion that there were two real entities: atoms, which were small indivisible particles of matter, and the void, which was the empty space in which matter was located. Although all the explanations from Thales to Democritus involve matter, what is more important is the fact that these rival explanations suggest an ongoing process of debate in which alternate theories were put forth and criticized.

Xenophanes of Colophon prefigured paleontology and geology as he thought that periodically the earth and sea mix and turn all to mud, citing several fossils of sea creatures that he had seen.

==== Pythagorean philosophy ====
The materialist explanations of the origins of the cosmos were attempts at answering the question of how an organized universe came to be; however, the idea of a random assemblage of elements (e.g., fire or water) producing an ordered universe without the existence of some ordering principle remained problematic to some.

One answer to this problem was advanced by the followers of Pythagoras (c. 582–507 BC), who saw number as the fundamental unchanging entity underlying all the structure of the universe. Although it is difficult to separate fact from legend, it appears that some Pythagoreans believed matter to be made up of ordered arrangements of points according to geometrical principles: triangles, squares, rectangles, or other figures. Other Pythagoreans saw the universe arranged on the basis of numbers, ratios, and proportions, much like musical scales. Philolaus, for instance, held that there were ten heavenly bodies because the sum of 1 + 2 + 3 + 4 gives the perfect number 10. Thus, the Pythagoreans were some of the first to apply mathematical principles to explain the rational basis of an orderly universe—an idea that was to have immense consequences in the development of scientific thought.

==== Hippocrates and the Hippocratic Corpus ====
According to tradition, the physician Hippocrates of Kos (460–370 BC) is considered the "father of medicine" because he was the first to make use of prognosis and clinical observation, to categorize diseases, and to formulate the ideas behind humoral theory. However, most of the Hippocratic Corpus—a collection of medical theories, practices, and diagnoses—was often attributed to Hippocrates with very little justification, thus making it difficult to know what Hippocrates actually thought, wrote, and did.

Despite their wide variability in terms of style and method, the writings of the Hippocratic Corpus had a significant influence on the medical practice of Islamic and Western medicine for more than a thousand years.

=== Schools of philosophy ===
==== The Academy ====
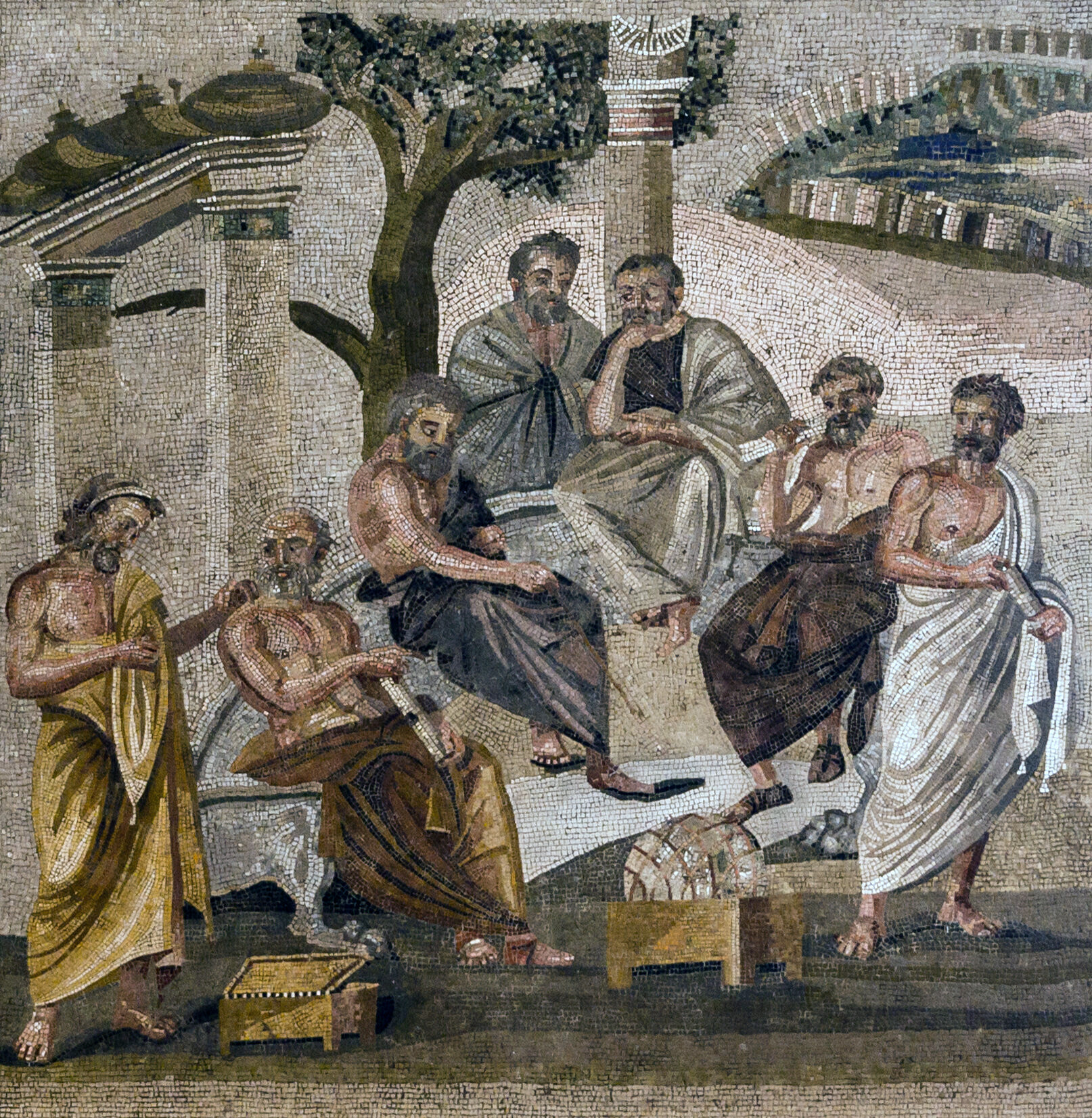
A mosaic depicting Plato's Academy, from the Villa of T. Siminius Stephanus in Pompeii (1st century AD)

The first institution of higher learning in Ancient Greece was founded by Plato (c. 427 – c. 347 BC), an Athenian who—perhaps under Pythagorean influence—appears to have identified the ordering principle of the universe as one based on number and geometry. A later account has it that Plato had inscribed at the entrance to the academy the words "Let no man ignorant of geometry enter." Although the story is most likely a myth, it nonetheless testifies to Plato's interest in mathematics, which is alluded to in several of his dialogues.

Plato's philosophy maintained that all material things are imperfect reflections of eternal unchanging ideas, just as all mathematical diagrams are reflections of eternal unchanging mathematical truths. Since Plato believed that material things had an inferior kind of reality, he considered that demonstrative knowledge cannot be achieved by looking at the imperfect material world. Truth is to be found through rational argumentation, analogous to the demonstrations of mathematicians. For instance, Plato recommended that astronomy be studied in terms of abstract geometrical models rather than empirical observations, and proposed that leaders be trained in mathematics in preparation for philosophy.

Aristotle (384–322 BC) studied at the academy and nonetheless disagreed with Plato in several important respects. While he agreed that truth must be eternal and unchanging, Aristotle maintained that the world is knowable through experience and that we come to know the truth by what we perceive with our senses. For him, directly observable things are real; ideas (or as he called them, forms) only exist as they express themselves in matter, such as in living things, or in the mind of an observer or artisan.

Aristotle's theory of reality led to a different approach to science. Unlike Plato, Aristotle emphasized observation of the material entities which embody the forms. He also played down (but did not negate) the importance of mathematics in the study of nature. The process of change took precedence over Plato's focus on eternal unchanging ideas in Aristotle's philosophy. Finally, he reduced the importance of Plato's forms to one of four causal factors.

Aristotle thus distinguished between four causes:

- the matter of which a thing was made (the material cause).
- the form into which it was made (the formal cause; similar to Plato's ideas).
- the agent who made the thing (the moving or efficient cause).
- the purpose for which the thing was made (the final cause).

Aristotle insisted that scientific knowledge (Ancient Greek: ἐπιστήμη, Latin: scientia) is knowledge of necessary causes. He and his followers would not accept mere description or prediction as science. Most characteristic of Aristotle's causes is his final cause, the purpose for which a thing is made. He came to this insight through his biological researches, such as those of marine animals at Lesbos, in which he noted that the organs of animals serve a particular function:

The absence of chance and the serving of ends are found in the works of nature especially. And the end for the sake of which a thing has been constructed or has come to be belongs to what is beautiful.

==== The Lyceum ====
After Plato's death, Aristotle left the academy and traveled widely before returning to Athens to found a school adjacent to the Lyceum. As one of the most prolific natural philosophers of Antiquity, Aristotle wrote and lecture on many topics of scientific interest, including biology, meteorology, psychology, logic, and physics. He developed a comprehensive physical theory that was a variation of the classical theory of the elements (earth, water, fire, air, and aether). In his theory, the light elements (fire and air) have a natural tendency to move away from the center of the universe while the heavy elements (earth and water) have a natural tendency to move toward the center of the universe, thereby forming a spherical Earth. Since the celestial bodies (i.e., the planets and stars) were seen to move in circles, he concluded that they must be made of a fifth element, which he called aether.

Aristotle used intuitive ideas to justify his reasoning and could point to the falling stone, rising flames, or pouring water to illustrate his theory. His laws of motion emphasized the common observation that friction was an omnipresent phenomenon: that any body in motion would, unless acted upon, come to rest. He also proposed that heavier objects fall faster, and that voids were impossible.

Aristotle's successor at the Lyceum was Theophrastus, who wrote valuable books describing plant and animal life. His works are regarded as the first to put botany and zoology on a systematic footing. Theophrastus' work on mineralogy provided descriptions of ores and minerals known to the world at that time, making some shrewd observations of their properties. For example, he made the first known reference to the phenomenon that the mineral tourmaline attracts straws and bits of wood when heated, now known to be caused by pyroelectricity. Pliny the Elder makes clear references to his use of the work in his Natural History, while updating and making much new information available on minerals himself. From both these early texts was to emerge the science of mineralogy, and ultimately geology. Both authors describe the sources of the minerals they discuss in the various mines exploited in their time, so their works should be regarded not just as early scientific texts, but also important for the history of engineering and the history of technology.

Other notable peripatetics include Strato, who was a tutor in the court of the Ptolemies and who devoted time to physical research, Eudemus, who edited Aristotle's works and wrote the first books on the history of science, and Demetrius of Phalerum, who governed Athens for a time and later may have helped establish the Library of Alexandria.

== Hellenistic age ==
The military campaigns of Alexander the Great spread Greek thought to Egypt, Asia Minor, Persia, up to the Indus River. The resulting migration of many Greek speaking populations across these territories provided the impetus for the foundation of several seats of learning, such as those in Alexandria, Antioch, and Pergamum.

Hellenistic science differed from Greek science in at least two respects: first, it benefited from the cross-fertilization of Greek ideas with those that had developed in other non-Hellenic civilizations; secondly, to some extent, it was supported by royal patrons in the kingdoms founded by Alexander's successors. The city of Alexandria, in particular, became a major center of scientific research in the 3rd century BC. Two institutions established there during the reigns of Ptolemy I Soter (367–282 BC) and Ptolemy II Philadelphus (309–246 BC) were the Library and the Museum. Unlike Plato's Academy and Aristotle's Lyceum, these institutions were officially supported by the Ptolemies, although the extent of patronage could be precarious depending on the policies of the current ruler.

Hellenistic scholars often employed the principles developed in earlier Greek thought in their scientific investigations, such as the application of mathematics to phenomena or the deliberate collection of empirical data. The assessment of Hellenistic science, however, varies widely. At one extreme is the view of English classical scholar Cornford, who believed that "all the most important and original work was done in the three centuries from 600 to 300 BC". At the other end is the view of Italian physicist and mathematician Lucio Russo, who claims that the scientific method was actually born in the 3rd century BC, only to be largely forgotten during the Roman period and not revived again until the Renaissance.

=== Technology ===
Diagram of the Antikythera mechanism, an analog astronomical calculator

A good example of the level of achievement in astronomical knowledge and engineering during the Hellenistic age can be seen in the Antikythera mechanism (150–100 BC). It is a 37-gear mechanical computer which calculated the motions of the Sun, Moon, and possibly the other five planets known to the ancients. The Antikythera mechanism included lunar and solar eclipses predicted on the basis of astronomical periods believed to have been learned from the Babylonians. The device may have been part of an ancient Greek tradition of complex mechanical technology that was later, at least in part, transmitted to the Byzantine and Islamic worlds, where mechanical devices which were complex, albeit simpler than the Antikythera mechanism, were built during the Middle Ages. Fragments of a geared calendar attached to a sundial, from the fifth or sixth century Byzantine Empire, have been found; the calendar may have been used to assist in telling time. A geared calendar similar to the Byzantine device was described by the scientist al-Biruni around 1000, and a surviving 13th-century astrolabe also contains a similar clockwork device.

=== Medicine ===
An important school of medicine was formed in Alexandria from the late 4th century to the 2nd century BC. Beginning with Ptolemy I Soter, medical officials were allowed to cut open and examine cadavers for the purposes of learning how human bodies operated. The first use of human bodies for anatomical research occurred in the work of Herophilos (335–280 BC) and Erasistratus (c. 304 – c. 250 BC), who gained permission to perform live dissections, or vivisections, on condemned criminals in Alexandria under the auspices of the Ptolemaic dynasty.

Herophilos developed a body of anatomical knowledge much more informed by the actual structure of the human body than previous works had been. He also reversed the longstanding notion made by Aristotle that the heart was the "seat of intelligence", arguing for the brain instead. Herophilos also wrote on the distinction between veins and arteries, and made many other accurate observations about the structure of the human body, especially the nervous system. Erasistratus differentiated between the function of the sensory and motor nerves, and linked them to the brain. He is credited with one of the first in-depth descriptions of the cerebrum and cerebellum. For their contributions, Herophilos is often called the "father of anatomy", while Erasistratus is regarded by some as the "founder of physiology".

=== Mathematics ===
Apollonius wrote a comprehensive study of conic sections in the Conics.

Greek mathematics in the Hellenistic period reached a level of sophistication not matched for several centuries afterward, as much of the work represented by scholars active at this time was of a very advanced level. There is also evidence of combining mathematical knowledge with high levels of technical expertise, as found for instance in the construction of massive building projects (e.g., the Syracusia), or in Eratosthenes' (276–195 BC) measurement of the distance between the Sun and the Earth and the size of the Earth.

Although few in number, Hellenistic mathematicians actively communicated with each other; publication consisted of passing and copying someone's work among colleagues. Among the most recognizable is the work of Euclid (325–265 BC), who presumably authored a series of books known as the Elements, a canon of geometry and elementary number theory for many centuries. Euclid's Elements served as the main textbook for the teaching of theoretical mathematics until the early 20th century.

Archimedes (287–212 BC), a Sicilian Greek, wrote about a dozen treatises where he communicated many remarkable results, such as the sum of an infinite geometric series in Quadrature of the Parabola, an approximation to the value π in Measurement of the Circle, and a nomenclature to express very large numbers in the Sand Reckoner.

The most characteristic product of Greek mathematics may be the theory of conic sections, which was largely developed in the Hellenistic period, primarily by Apollonius (262–190 BC). The methods used made no explicit use of algebra, nor trigonometry, the latter appearing around the time of Hipparchus (190–120 BC).

=== Astronomy ===
Advances in mathematical astronomy also took place during the Hellenistic age. Aristarchus of Samos (310–230 BC) was an ancient Greek astronomer and mathematician who presented the first known heliocentric model that placed the Sun at the center of the known universe, with the Earth revolving around the Sun once a year and rotating about its axis once a day. Aristarchus also estimated the sizes of the Sun and Moon as compared to Earth's size, and the distances to the Sun and Moon. His heliocentric model did not find many adherents in antiquity but did influence some early modern astronomers, such as Nicolaus Copernicus, who was aware of the heliocentric theory of Aristarchus.

In the 2nd century BC, Hipparchus discovered precession, calculated the size and distance of the Moon and invented the earliest known astronomical devices such as the astrolabe. Hipparchus also created a comprehensive catalog of 1020 stars, and most of the constellations of the northern hemisphere derive from Greek astronomy. It has recently been claimed that a celestial globe based on Hipparchus's star catalog sits atop the broad shoulders of a large 2nd-century Roman statue known as the Farnese Atlas.

== Roman era ==
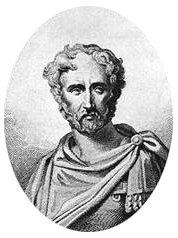
A 19th-century portrait of Pliny the Elder

Science during the Roman Empire was concerned with systematizing knowledge gained in the preceding Hellenistic age and the knowledge from the vast areas the Romans had conquered. It was largely the work of authors active in this period that would be passed on uninterrupted to later civilizations.

Even though science continued under Roman rule, Latin texts were mainly compilations drawing on earlier Greek work. Advanced scientific research and teaching continued to be carried on in Greek. Such Greek and Hellenistic works as survived were preserved and developed later in the Byzantine Empire and then in the Islamic world. Late Roman attempts to translate Greek writings into Latin had limited success (e.g., Boethius), and direct knowledge of most ancient Greek texts only reached western Europe from the 12th century onwards.

=== Pliny ===
Pliny the Elder published the Naturalis Historia in 77 AD, one of the most extensive compilations of the natural world which survived into the Middle Ages. Pliny did not simply list materials and objects but also recorded explanations of phenomena. Thus he is the first to correctly describe the origin of amber as being the fossilized resin of pine trees. He makes the inference from the observation of trapped insects within some amber samples.

Pliny's work is divided neatly into the organic world of plants and animals, and the realm of inorganic matter, although there are frequent digressions in each section. He is especially interested in not just describing the occurrence of plants, animals and insects, but also their exploitation (or abuse) by man. The description of metals and minerals is particularly detailed, and valuable as being the most extensive compilation still available from the ancient world. Although much of the work was compiled by judicious use of written sources, Pliny gives an eyewitness account of gold mining in Spain, where he was stationed as an officer. Pliny is especially significant because he provides full bibliographic details of the earlier authors and their works he uses and consults. Because his encyclopaedia survived the Dark Ages, we know of these lost works, even if the texts themselves have disappeared. The book was one of the first to be printed in 1489, and became a standard reference work for Renaissance scholars, as well as an inspiration for the development of a scientific and rational approach to the world.

=== Hero ===
Hero of Alexandria was a Greco-Egyptian mathematician and engineer who is often considered to be the greatest experimenter of antiquity. Among his most famous inventions was a windwheel, constituting the earliest instance of wind harnessing on land, and a well-recognized description of a steam-powered device called an aeolipile, which was the first-recorded steam engine.

=== Galen ===
The greatest medical practitioner and philosopher of this era was Galen, active in the 2nd century AD. Around 100 of his works survive—the most for any ancient Greek author—and fill 22 volumes of modern text. Galen was born in the ancient Greek city of Pergamon (now in Turkey), the son of a successful architect who gave him a liberal education. Galen was instructed in all major philosophical schools (Platonism, Aristotelianism, Stoicism and Epicureanism) until his father, moved by a dream of Asclepius, decided he should study medicine. After his father's death, Galen traveled widely searching for the best doctors in Smyrna, Corinth, and finally Alexandria.

Galen compiled much of the knowledge obtained by his predecessors, and furthered the inquiry into the function of organs by performing dissections and vivisections on Barbary apes, oxen, pigs, and other animals. In 158 AD, Galen served as chief physician to the gladiators in his native Pergamon, and was able to study all kinds of wounds without performing any actual human dissection. It was through his experiments, however, that Galen was able to overturn many long-held beliefs, such as the theory that the arteries contained air which carried it to all parts of the body from the heart and the lungs. This belief was based originally on the arteries of dead animals, which appeared to be empty. Galen was able to demonstrate that living arteries contain blood, but his error, which became the established medical orthodoxy for centuries, was to assume that the blood goes back and forth from the heart in an ebb-and-flow motion.

Anatomy was a prominent part of Galen's medical education and was a major source of interest throughout his life. He wrote two great anatomical works, On anatomical procedure and On the uses of the parts of the body of man. The information in these tracts became the foundation of authority for all medical writers and physicians for the next 1300 years until they were challenged by Vesalius and Harvey in the 16th century.

=== Ptolemy ===
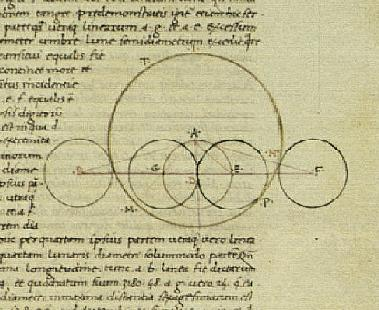
George Trebizond's Latin translation of Ptolemy's Almagest (c. 1451)

Claudius Ptolemy (c. 100–170 AD), living in or around Alexandria, carried out a scientific program centered on the writing of about a dozen books on astronomy, astrology, cartography, harmonics, and optics. Despite their severe style and high technicality, a great deal of them have survived, in some cases the sole remnants of their kind of writing from antiquity. Two major themes that run through Ptolemy's works are mathematical modelling of physical phenomena and methods of visual representation of physical reality.

Ptolemy's research program involved a combination of theoretical analysis with empirical considerations seen, for instance, in his systematized study of astronomy. Ptolemy's Mathēmatikē Syntaxis (Ancient Greek: Μαθηματικὴ Σύνταξις), better known as the Almagest, sought to improve on the work of his predecessors by building astronomy not only upon a secure mathematical basis but also by demonstrating the relationship between astronomical observations and the resulting astronomical theory. In his Planetary Hypotheses, Ptolemy describes in detail physical representations of his mathematical models found in the Almagest, presumably for didactic purposes. Likewise, the Geography was concerned with the drawing of accurate maps using astronomical information, at least in principle. Apart from astronomy, both the Harmonics and the Optics contain (in addition to mathematical analyses of sound and sight, respectively) instructions on how to construct and use experimental instruments to corroborate theory. In retrospect, it is apparent that Ptolemy adjusted some reported measurements to fit his (incorrect) assumption that the angle of refraction is proportional to the angle of incidence.

Ptolemy's thoroughness and his preoccupation with ease of data presentation (for example, in his widespread use of tables) virtually guaranteed that earlier work on these subjects be neglected or considered obsolete, to the extent that almost nothing remains of the works Ptolemy often refers. His astronomical work in particular defined the method and subject matter of future research for centuries, and the Ptolemaic system became the dominant model for the motions of the heavens until the seventeenth century.

== See also ==
- Forensics in antiquity
- Protoscience
- Roman technology
- Obsolete scientific theories
