= Daniel D. Langleben =

American psychiatrist

Daniel Langleben is an American psychiatrist, professor, and scientific researcher. He pioneered a technique for using functional magnetic resonance imaging (fMRI) as a means of lie detection. He has also studied the brain effects of packaging and advertising and how infants' cuteness motivates caretaking in adults.

== Biography ==
He received his Doctor of Medicine degree in 1989 and had his postgraduate training in psychiatry, addiction psychiatry, radiology and Nuclear Medicine at the Medical College of Pennsylvania, the Mount Sinai Hospital, UCSF and Stanford University Hospital.

== fMRI and lie detection ==
=== 2001 study ===
Langleben was inspired to test lie detection while he was at Stanford University studying the effects of a drug on children with attention deficit hyperactivity disorder (ADHD). He found that these children have a more difficult time inhibiting the truth. He postulated that lying requires increased brain activity compared to truth because the truth must be suppressed, essentially creating more work for the brain. In 2001, he published his first work with lie detection using a modified form of the Guilty Knowledge Test, which is sometimes used in polygraph tests. The subjects, right-handed, male college students, were given a card and a Yes/No handheld clicker. They were told to lie to a computer asking questions while they underwent a brain scan only when the question would reveal their card. The subjects were given $20 for participating, and told they would receive more money if they deceived the computer; however, none did.

His studies showed that the inferior and superior prefrontal and anterior cingulate gyri and the parietal cortex showed increased activity during deception. In 2002, he licensed his methods for lie detection to the No Lie MRI company located in San Diego, California.

=== Critiques ===
Critiques of this technique point out that fMRI does not actually measure lying, only the increased brain activity that occurs when one is lying. Using fMRI for lie detection could then lead to false positives produced by anxiety or other causes.

Another concern is that a "lie" is not always clear-cut, and may be a complex concept. More complex types of deception may not be detected by imaging techniques.

== Selected publications ==
- Langleben, Daniel D. (1 February 2008). "Detection of deception with fMRI: Are we there yet?". Legal and Criminological Psychology. 13 (1): 1–9. doi:10.1348/135532507X251641. Archived from the original on May 7, 2009.
- Moriarty, Jane C.; Langleben, Daniel D. (May 1, 2013). "Using Brain Imaging for Lie Detection: Where Science, Law and Research Policy Collide". Psychol Public Policy Law. 19 (2): 222–234. doi:10.1037/a0028841. PMC 3680134. PMID 23772173. SSRN 2139408.
- Wang, An-Li; et al. (April 2013). "Content matters: neuroimaging investigation of brain and behavioral impact of televised anti-tobacco public service announcements". Journal of Neuroscience. 33 (17): 7420–7427. doi:10.1523/JNEUROSCI.3840-12.2013. PMC 3773220. PMID 23616548.
- Langleben DD; Hakun JG; Seelig D; Wang AL; Ruparel K & Bilker WB (2016). "Polygraphy and functional magnetic resonance imaging in lie detection: a controlled blind comparison using the concealed information test". J Clin Psychiatry. 77 (10): 1372–1380. doi:10.4088/JCP.15m09785. PMID 26794034.
