= Timed antagonistic response alethiometer =

Type of lie detection technique

The timed antagonistic response alethiometer, or TARA, is a type of lie detection technique that relies upon cognitive chronometry.

The TARA is a computer-based technique. It requires respondents to classify a succession of mixed statements as true or false, as quickly and accurately as they can, by pressing one of two keys. The faster they do so, the more likely they are to be telling the truth; the slower they do so, the more likely they are to be lying.

The TARA works by manufacturing an artificial situation in which lying is more challenging than truth-telling. Specifically, it permits truth-tellers to complete two alternating tasks using the same strategy, but requires liars to complete them using contradictory strategies. Hence, if both truth-tellers and liars complete the TARA accurately as stipulated, then the former will complete it more quickly than the latter, all else being equal.

Structurally, the TARA bears some affinities with the implicit association test (IAT), because it generates differences in average reaction time on the basis of differences in response compatibility.

The TARA remains to be field-tested. However, initial laboratory studies obtained accuracy rates in the region of 85%, suggesting that the technique holds promise.
