= Aldert Vrij =

Dutch psychologist

Aldert Vrij (born 1960) is a professor of applied social psychology in the department of psychology at the University of Portsmouth in Portsmouth, England. His main area of expertise is utilizing nonverbal and verbal cues of deception, also called lie detection. Author of numerous research articles, Vrij has found that human beings can become more accurate judges of truth and deception not by passive observation of a speaker's verbal and nonverbal behavior but by tactically outsmarting liars through use of various techniques.

He is editor of the scholarly journal Legal and Criminological Psychology, published by the British Psychological Society. He serves on the boards of the journals Law and Human Behavior, Psychology, Public Policy and Law, and Human Communication Research. He serves on the board of governors of the Society for Applied Research in Memory and Cognition. He is a Programme Director of research on 'Eliciting Information' at the Centre for Research and Evidence on Security Threats.

Vrij earned a Ph.D. in 1991 from Vrije Universiteit in Amsterdam.
