= Legal and Criminological Psychology =

- Discipline: legal psychology and criminological psychology
- Language: English
- Edited by: Jaume Masip (University of Salamanca, Spain)

Publication details
- History: 1996-present
- Publisher: Wiley-Blackwell on behalf of the British Psychological Society (United Kingdom)
- Frequency: Quarterly
- Impact factor: 1.764 (2018)

Standard abbreviations
- ISO 4: Leg. Criminol. Psychol.

Indexing
- ISSN: 2044-8333
- OCLC no.: 818976605

Links
- Journal homepage

Legal and Criminological Psychology is a quarterly academic journal published by the British Psychological Society. The journal was established in 1996. In 2018, it had an ISI impact factor of 1.764, ranking it 23 out of 65 in Criminology and Penology, 33 out of 148 in Law and 51 out of 137 in Multidisciplinary Psychology.

It is abstracted and indexed by:

- Academic Search Alumni Edition
- Criminal Justice Abstracts
- Embase
- ProQuest Central
- PsycINFO
- SCOPUS
- Social Sciences Citation Index
- SocINDEX
- Web of Science
