= Resting position =

Pose assumed when not engaged in an activity that demands some other pose

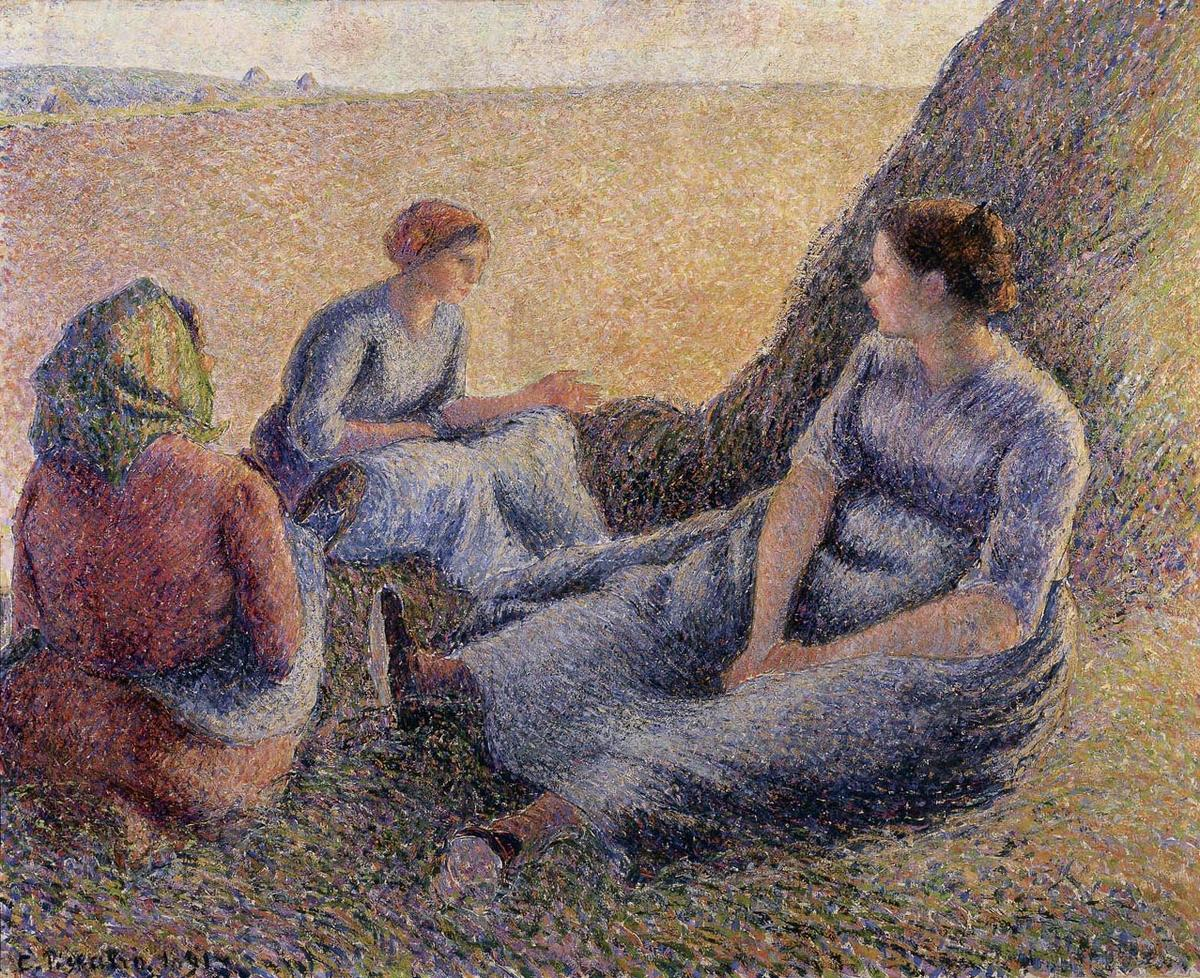
Pissarro - Haymakers Resting, 1891

A resting position or rest position is a default human position or pose assumed (typically deliberately) when a person is not engaged in an activity that demands some other pose, or between poses.

== General rest positions ==
Common resting positions of the body include kneeling, leaning, lying, sitting, and squatting. In microgravity, the relaxed human body naturally assumes neutral body posture.

== Rest positions in specific activities ==
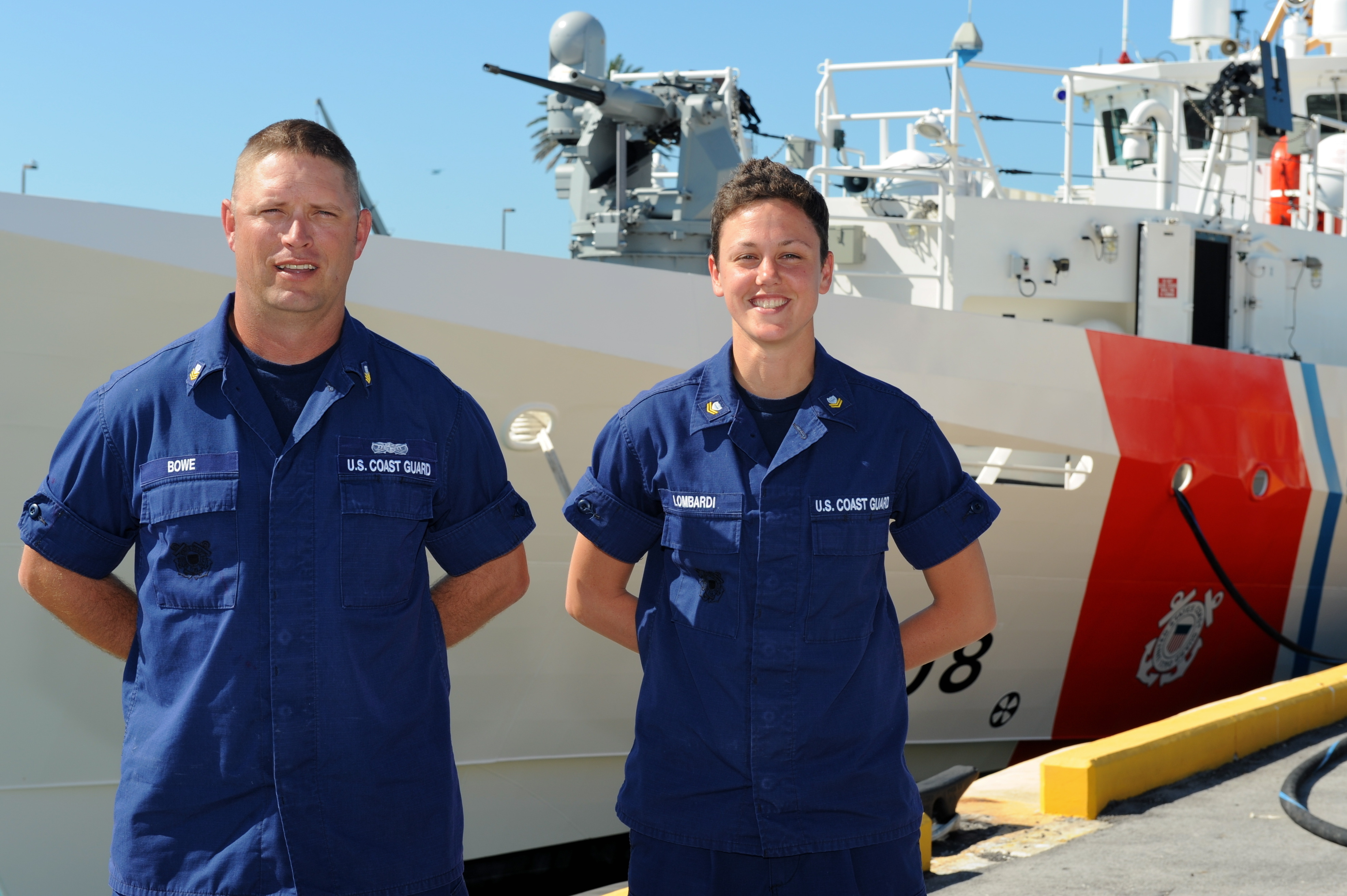
Uniformed officers standing at ease

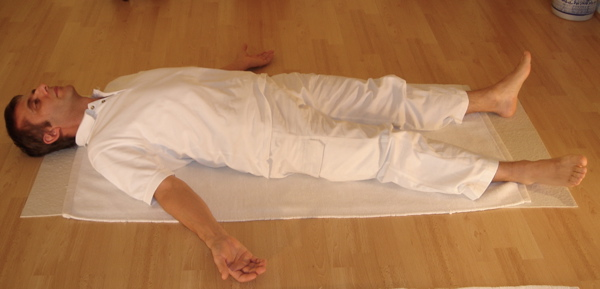
The Shavasana pose in yoga

Home row on a standard keyboard

A number of disciplines specify particular resting positions, with various purposes.

=== Body ===
Ballet incorporates several resting poses, including a neutral pose described by Cesare Negri and Jacob de Gheyn II with the feet at 45 degrees, back strait, and chin erect. Neoclassical ballet includes a rest or "preparatory" position called "B plus" (possibly named for George Balanchine), also called attitude a terre, in which the standing leg is straight, and the back leg curved with the toe pointed.

Military parade discipline includes standing rest positions, generally assumed following a command of "At ease", "Stand easy", or "Relax".

Some forms of yoga incorporate the Shavasana or "Corpse Pose", a rest position used for wakeful relaxation and meditation, often at the end of a session.

=== Hands and arms ===
Gun safety rules generally specify that the trigger finger should not rest on the trigger when not firing, but alongside the trigger guard.

In various sign languages, rest positions may be used to convey grammatical meaning.

In touch typing, the home row is a rest position for the hands, placing all the standard keys within easy reach.
