= Het Vrije Woord =

Het Vrije Woord (Dutch, literally 'The Free Word' or more generally 'Free Expression'), may refer to:

- Het Vrije Woord (Dutch East Indies newspaper), from 1915 to 1922
- Het Vrije Woord (Belgian newspaper), during World War Two
