= Lying (position) =

Horizontal body position

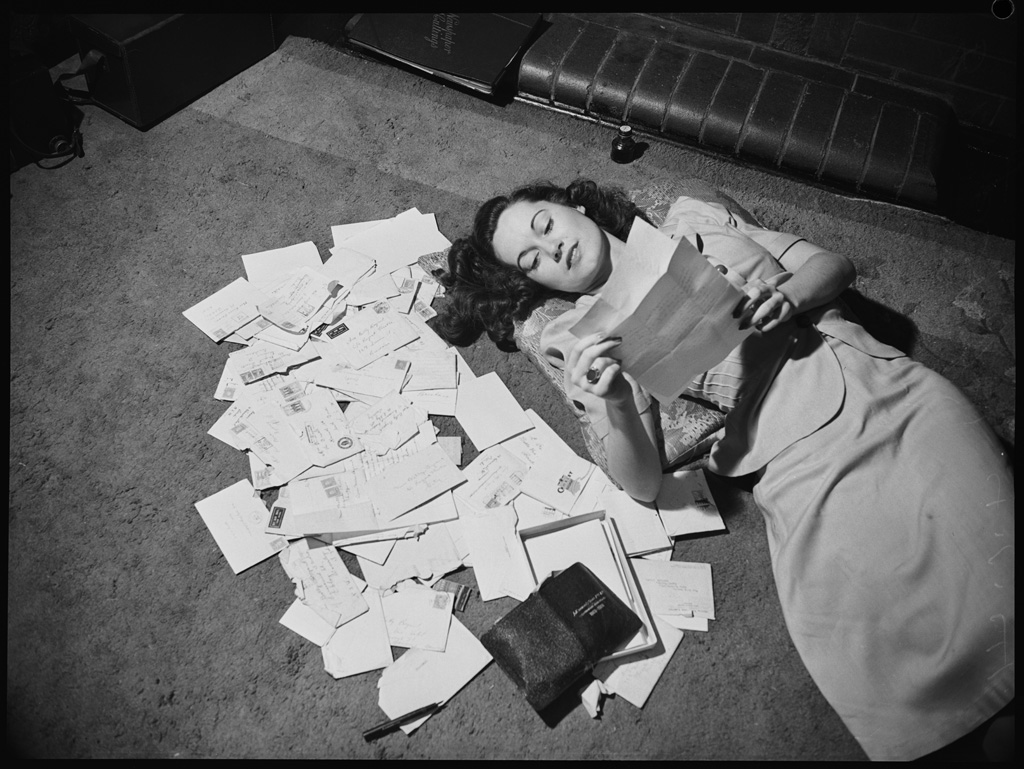
Betty Bryant lying down and reading letters

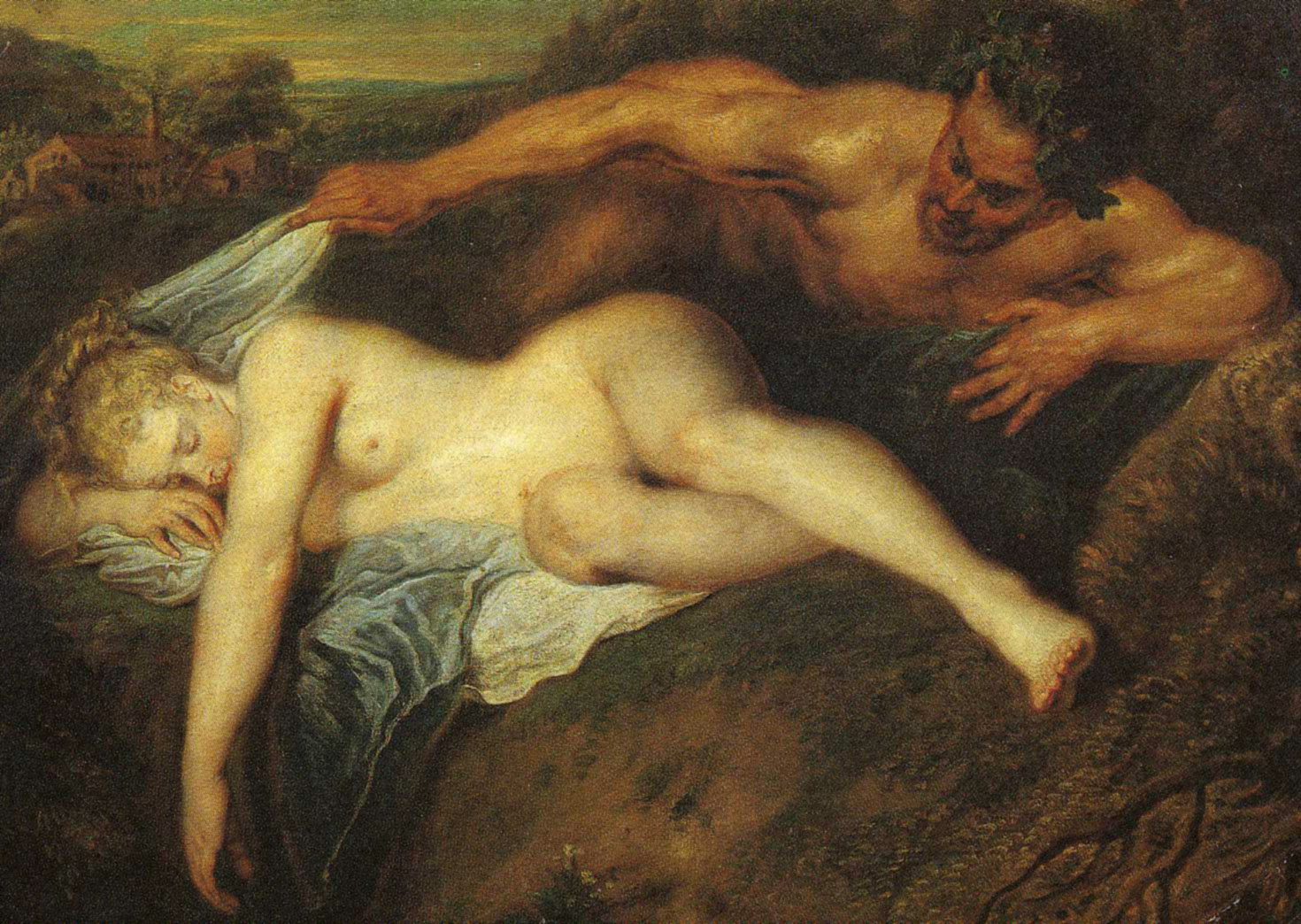
Painting of a lying woman. Detail from Jupiter and Antiope (Watteau)

Lying – also called recumbency, prostration, or decubitus in medicine (from Latin decumbo 'to lie down') – is a type of human position in which the body is more or less horizontal and supported along its length by the surface underneath. Lying is the most common position while being immobilized (e.g. in bedrest), while sleeping, or while being struck by injury or disease.

== Positions ==
Supine and prone decubitus

Recovery position

When lying, the body may assume a great variety of shapes and positions. The following are the basic recognized ones.

- Supine: lying on the back on the ground with the face up.
- Prone: lying on the chest with the face down ("lying down" or "going prone"). See also "Prostration".
- Lying on either side, with the body straight or bent/curled forward or backward.
  - The fetal position is lying or sitting curled, with limbs close to the torso and the head close to the knees.
  - The recovery position (coma position), one of a series of variations on a lateral recumbent or three-quarters prone position of the body, into which an unconscious but breathing casualty can be placed as part of first aid treatment.

When medical professionals use this term to describe the position of a patient, they first state the part of the body on which the patient is resting followed by the word decubitus. For example, the right lateral decubitus position (RLDP) would mean that the patient is lying on their right side. Left lateral decubitus position (LLDP) would mean that the patient is lying on their left side.

Another example is angina decubitus 'chest pain while lying down'.

In radiology, this term implies that the patient is lying down with the X-ray being taken parallel to the horizon.

== As a treatment ==
Bedrest as a medical treatment refers to staying in bed day and night as a treatment for an illness or medical condition, especially when prescribed or chosen rather than resulting from severe prostration or imminent death. Even though most patients in hospitals spend most of their time in the hospital beds, bedrest more often refers to an extended period of recumbence at home.

== See also ==
- Bedridden
- Nap
- Resting position
