= Forensics in antiquity =

The ancient world lacked standardized practices of forensic science, which aided criminals in escaping punishment. Criminal investigations and trials relied on oaths, confessions and witness testimony. In a time when a distinction between science and such phenomena as religion, magic and superstition had not yet been made, some civilizations used practices such as the trial by ordeal to determine guilt or innocence.

However, ancient sources contain several accounts of techniques that foreshadow the concepts of forensic science that were made possible by the Scientific Revolution centuries later. Predating the scientific method, these techniques were not based on a scientific understanding of the world in the modern sense, but rather on common sense and practical experience.

On the other hand, the development of an accurate way of measuring density by Archimedes marks a watershed in the use of objective methods, not just in forensics but also in physical science.

== Physical methods ==
Archimedes may have used his principle of buoyancy to determine whether the golden crown was less dense than solid gold.

The "Eureka" legend told of Archimedes (287–212 BC), where the philosopher proved that a crown was not solid gold by comparing measurements of its displacement of water and its weight, is a direct forerunner of modern forensic engineering techniques. The case marks a critical point when quantitative methods become vital, as well as establishing the concepts of density, buoyancy, force and equilibrium.

The first recorded example of forensic dentistry may be the account of Agrippina, the Roman emperor Nero's mother, who sent for the head of her enemy Lollia Paulina to verify her death. While the face was distorted beyond recognition, Agrippina could recognize a distinctively colored front tooth that she had previously noticed in Lollia’s mouth.

The Old Testament story of the shibboleth, in which the victorious Gileadites identified (and killed) the vanquished Ephraimites because they could not properly pronounce the word "shibboleth", foreshadows modern voice identification techniques.

== Lie detection ==
In legal cultures where evidence consisted almost exclusively of oaths and testimony, finding out who told the truth was of great importance. While trial by ordeal was often used, some ancient lie detection techniques relied solely on the observation of the suspects' behavior.

In ancient India around 500 BC, priests tested suspected thieves by putting them into dark tents with donkeys whose tails were coated in soot. The suspects were told that the donkeys would bray if touched by thieves, and that the suspects should now pull the animals' tails. Those who left the tent with clean hands (indicating that they had not dared to touch the animals for fear of being found out as thieves by the donkeys' braying) were considered guilty.

Another technique employed in ancient China bore resemblance to modern polygraph tests in that it, too, relied on physiological reactions. Dried rice was placed in the mouth of suspects, and when they spat the rice out, they were considered guilty if they still had rice sticking to their tongue. Persons under stress tend to have a dry mouth and cannot produce enough saliva to spit out all the rice, and a guilty person would presumably be under more stress in such a situation than an innocent.

The Hebrew story of Susanna depicts the use of interrogation of two separate witnesses, resulting in their contradicting each other and exposing the falsehood of their accusation against Susanna.

== Documents and prints ==
In societies where most people were illiterate, documents were often forged and methods of detecting or preventing fraud were much sought after. In ancient Rome, officials employed experts in handwriting analysis to compare the writing styles of scribes in order to detect forgery.

The ancients were aware of fingerprints, and may have known that their patterns were unique to each person. They did not, however, use that knowledge for criminal investigations (as in modern dactylography). But in the first century BC the Roman attorney Quintilian won his client’s acquittal for murder by showing that the suspect's hand did not match a bloody palm print at the murder site.

Prints were more commonly used for identification. Hand and fingerprints were widely accepted as signatures as early as 2000 BC in Babylonia.

== Medical evidence ==
Ancient physicians often took part in criminal investigations, in part because of their connections to rulers, and Hippocrates recommended as early as in the fourth century BC that physicians learn how to recognize injuries and poisonings inflicted by criminals.

Autopsies that sought to determine the cause of death are attested at least in the early third millennium BC, although they were opposed in many ancient societies where it was believed that the disfigurement of dead persons prevented them from entering the afterlife. Notable Greek autopsists were Erasistratus and Herophilus of Chalcedon, who lived in 3rd century BC Alexandria, but in general, autopsies were rare in ancient Greece. Notably, in 44 BC, Julius Caesar was the subject of an official autopsy after his murder by rival senators, and the physician's report noted that the second stab wound Caesar received was the fatal one. Some historians believe that the word "forensic" itself relates to that autopsy conducted after Caesar's murder in the Roman Forum.

Ancient physicians could not easily establish poisoning as a cause of death, because its symptoms were often similar to those of natural seizures. While poisons were a matter of particular interest to ancient scientists, the methods of analysis they devised remained simplistic. Many of these were collected in the works of the reputed physician and poet Nicander of Colophon (c. 200 BC), but his works were published in print for the first time in 1499.
