= Lie detection =

Assessment of statements to reveal deceit

Lie detection is an assessment of a verbal statement with the goal to reveal a possible intentional deceit. Lie detection may refer to a cognitive process of detecting deception by evaluating message content as well as non-verbal cues. Typically, people are not as good at detecting lies as they think they are. The average person can only detect lying with chance accuracy, and experts, including law enforcement, are not significantly better at it. There are a number of reasons as to this — the average person also does not expect others to lie to them and instinctively believes others are being truthful.

Lie detection may also refer to questioning techniques used along with technology that record physiological functions to ascertain truth and falsehood in response. The latter is commonly used by law enforcement in the United States, but rarely in other countries because it is based on pseudoscience. There are a wide variety of technologies available for this purpose. The most common and long used measure is the polygraph. A comprehensive 2003 review by the National Academy of Sciences of existing research concluded that there was "little basis for the expectation that a polygraph test could have extremely high accuracy." There is no evidence to substantiate that non-verbal lie detection, such as by looking at body language, is an effective way to detect lies, even if it is widely used by law enforcement.

== Cues of Deception ==
There are several verbal cues that could indicate someone is being deceptive. Liars tend to give briefer and more vague statements that are detached from the self. Highly structured stories that have fewer details lower the potential risk of inconsistency, but they also often lack contextual and sensory detail as a result. Liars have also been shown to avoid amending their statements in favour of definitive stories, while people who are telling the truth will correct themselves more naturally and provide less perfect memory traces. Since lying requires more cognitive load than being truthful, people who are being deceptive may also be slower to respond and speak in shorter statements that have more pauses and simpler grammar. However, these cues are highly variable between individuals due to factors including experience with lying, motivation, cultural norms, and cognitive ability, and therefore have low predictive power.

There are several non-verbal cues that are popularly believed to imply that someone is lying, including avoiding eye contact and fidgeting and touching their face more. However, it has been found that these cues are not consistent indicators of lying, and reflect common theories rather than reliable support. Some studies have found non-verbal differences between liars and truth tellers, but they are statistically small and conflicting. For example, increased cognitive load due to lying may be reflected in non-verbal cues such as decreased and slower movement, but this difference is so subtle it is overshadowed by variability between individuals. As with verbal cues of deception, non-verbal behaviour is strongly influenced by factors including culture, personality, and mental health, making the reliability of non-verbal cues inconsistent.

== General accuracy and limitations of assessment ==
The cumulative research evidence suggests that machines do detect deception better than chance, but with significant error rates and that strategies used to "beat" polygraph examinations, so-called countermeasures, may be effective. Despite unreliability, results are admissible in court in some countries, such as Japan. Lie detector results are very rarely admitted in evidence in the US courts.

In 1983 the U.S. Congress Office of Technology Assessment published a review of the technology and found:

"...there is at present only limited scientific evidence for establishing the validity of polygraph testing. Even where the evidence seems to indicate that polygraph testing detects deceptive subjects better than chance, significant error rates are possible, and examiner and examinee differences and the use of countermeasures may further affect validity."

In the 2007 peer-reviewed academic article "Charlatanry in forensic speech science", the authors reviewed 50 years of lie detector research and came to the conclusion that there is no scientific evidence supporting that voice analysis lie detectors actually work. Lie detector manufacturer Nemesysco threatened to sue the academic publisher for libel resulting in removal of the article from online databases. In a letter to the publisher, Nemesysco's lawyers wrote that the authors of the article could be sued for defamation if they wrote on the subject again.

Nevertheless, extraneous "noise" on the polygraph can come from embarrassment or anxiety and not be specific to lying. When subjects are aware of the assessment their resulting emotional response, especially anxiety, can impact the data. Additionally, psychological disorders can cause problems with data as certain disorders can lead a person to make a statement they believe to be truth but is actually a fabrication. As well as with all testing, the examiner can cause biases within the test with their interaction with the subject and interpretation of the data.

== History ==
=== 20th century ===
The study of physiological methods for deception tests measuring emotional disturbances began in the early 1900s. Vittorio Benussi was the first to work on practical deception tests based on physiological changes. He detected changes in inspiration-expiration ratio—findings confirmed by N.E. Burtt. Burtt conducted studies that emphasized the changes in quantitative systolic blood-pressure. William Moulton Marston studied blood-pressure and noted increase in systolic blood pressure of 10 mm Hg or over indicated guilt through using the tycos sphygmomanometer, with which he reported 90–100% accuracy. His studies used students and actual court cases. Then in 1913 W.M. Marston determined systolic blood-pressure by oscillatory methods and his findings cite definite changes in blood pressure during the deception of criminal suspects. In 1921, John Augustus Larson criticized Marston's intermittent blood pressure method because emotional changes were so brief they could be lost. To adjust for this he modified the Erlanger sphygmograph to give a continuous blood pressure and pulse curve and used it to study 4,000 criminals. In the 1990s, a team of scientists, Stanley Abrams, Jean M. Verdier and Oleg Maltsev developed a new methodology contributing six coefficients that positively affect the accuracy of the lie detector analysis results.

=== 21st century ===
Two meta-analyses conducted by 2004 found an association between lying and increased pupil size and compressed lips. Liars may stay still more, use fewer hand gestures, and make less eye contact. Liars may take more time to answer questions but on the other hand, if they have had time to prepare, they may answer more quickly than people telling the truth would, and talk less, and repeat phrases more. They do not appear to be more fidgety, blink more, or have a less-relaxed posture.

Paul Ekman has used the Facial Action Coding System (FACS) and "when combined with voice and speech measures, [it] reaches detection accuracy rates of up to 90 percent." However, there is currently no evidence to support such a claim. It is currently being automated for use in law enforcement and is still being improved to increase accuracy. His studies use micro-expressions, which last less than one-fifth of a second, and "may leak emotions someone wants to conceal, such as anger or guilt." However, "signs of emotion aren't necessarily signs of guilt. An innocent person may be apprehensive and appear guilty," Ekman reminds us. With regard to his studies, lies about emotions at the moment have the biggest payoff from face and voice cues while lies about beliefs and actions, such as crimes use cues from gestures and words are added. Ekman and his associates have validated many signs of deception, but do not publish all of them so as not to educate criminals

James Pennebaker uses the method of Linguistic Inquiry and Word Count (LIWC), published by Lawrence Erlbaum, to conduct an analysis of written content. He claims it has accuracy in predicting lying. Pennebaker cites his method as "significantly more effective than human judges in correctly identifying deceptive or truthful writing samples"; there is a 67% accuracy rate with his method, while trained people have 52% accuracy. There were five experimental procedures used in this study. Study 1–3 asked participants to speak, hand write or type a true or false statement about abortion. The participants were randomly assigned to tell a true or false statement. Study 4 focused on feelings about friends and study 5 had the students involved in a mock crime and asked to lie. Human judges were asked to rate the truthfulness of the 400 communications dealing with abortion. The judges read or watched the statement and gave it a yes or no answer about if this statement was false or not. LIWC correctly classified 67% of the abortion communications and the judges correctly classified 52%. His studies have identified that deception carries three primary written markers. The first is fewer first-person pronouns such as 'I', 'me', 'my', 'mine', and 'myself' (singular), as well as 'we', 'us', 'our', and 'ourselves' (plural). Those lying "avoid statements of ownership, distance themselves from their stories and avoid taking responsibility for their behavior" while also using more negative emotion words such as "hate, worthless and sad." Second, they use "few exclusionary words such as except, but or nor" when "distinguish[ing] what they did from what they did not do."

More recently evidence has been provided by the work of CA Morgan III and GA Hazlett that a computer analysis of cognitive interview derived speech content (i.e. response length and unique word count) provides a method for detecting deception that is both demonstrably better than professional judgments of professionals and useful at distinguishing between genuine and false adult claims of exposure to highly stressful, potentially traumatic events. This method shows particular promise as it is non confrontational as well as scientifically and cross culturally valid.

== Questioning and testing techniques ==
There are typically three types of questions used in polygraph testing or voice stress analysis testing:

Irrelevant questions establish a baseline to compare other answers by asking simple questions with clear true and false answers.

Comparison questions have an indirect relationship to the event or circumstance, and they are designed to encourage the subject to lie.

Relevant questions are compared against comparison questions (which should represent false answers) and irrelevant questions (which should represent true answers). They are about whatever is particularly in question.

The control question test (CQT) uses control questions, with known answers, to serve as a physiological baseline in order to compare them with questions relevant to a particular incident. The control question should have a greater physiological response if truth was told and a lesser physiological response for lying. The guilty knowledge test (GKT) is a multiple-choice format in which answer choices or one correct answer and additional incorrect answers are read and the physiological response is recorded. The controls are the incorrect alternative answers. The greater physiological response should be to the correct answer. Its point is to determine if the subject has knowledge about a particular event.

In addition to the test skewing towards not finding people innocent, there are also issues where some offenders might have a greater physiological response to the control question than to the specific question, making it difficult to determine guilt using this method even when people are not using specific techniques to try and trick the test. Although the issues with the CQT false-positive and false-negative rates are discussed above, there are also methodological issues with how proponents of the CQT determine the accuracy of the test. Due to the fact that the accuracy of the CQT is often determined through whether an individual who is given the test provides the police a confession to a crime after the test is administered, this means that cases where someone was cleared of charges after taking a polygraph or, in a worst-case scenario, gives a false confession when they are actually innocent are not taken into account when it comes to determining the accuracy of the test. Another issue is that, due to how the CQT is administered and how the lie-detection process works, only people who are determined to be deceptive are further interrogated for a confession. This means that the polygraph outcome and the confession are not independent of one another, making it very difficult to use confessions as the sole determiner of the accuracy of the test. These methodological problems provide false evidence that supports the continued use of this test, despite the many flaws that the test possesses. While it could be said that including this test as a police tool is useful because it might sometimes provide accurate information, the probability of it causing undue hardship to people who are actually innocent, and wasting time in the process, makes this a very unreliable method for law enforcement officers to use.

Both are considered to be biased against those that are innocent, because the guilty who fear the consequences of being found out can be more motivated to cheat on the test. Various techniques (which can be found online) can teach individuals how to change the results of the tests, including curling the toes, and biting the tongue. Mental arithmetic was found to be ineffective by at least one study, especially in students counting backward by seven. A study has found that in the guilty knowledge test subjects can focusing on the alternative answers and make themselves look innocent.

== Polygraph ==
Lie detection commonly involves the polygraph, and is used to test both styles of deception. It detects autonomic reactions, such as micro-expressions, breathing rate, skin conductivity, and heart rate. Micro-expressions are the brief and incomplete nonverbal changes in expression while the rest show an activation of the nervous system. These changes in body functions are not easily controlled by the conscious mind. They also may consider respiration rate, blood pressure, capillary dilation, and muscular movement. While taking a polygraph test the subject wears a blood pressure device to measure blood pressure fluctuations. Respiration is measured by wearing pneumographs around the chest, and finally electrodes are placed on the subject's fingers to measure skin conductivity. To determine truth it is assumed the subject will show more signs of fear when answering the control questions, known to the examiner, compared with the relevant questions, where the answers are not known. Polygraphs focus more on the exam's predictive value of guilt by comparing the responses of the participant to control questions, irrelevant questions, and relevant questions to gauge arousal, which is then interpreted as a display of fear and deception is assumed. If a person is showing a deception there will be changes in the autonomic arousal responses to the relevant questions. Results are considered inconclusive if there is no fluctuation in any of the questions.

These measures are supposed to indicate a short-term stress response which can be from lying or significance to the subject. The problem becomes that they are also associated with mental effort and emotional state, so they can be influenced by fear, anger, and surprise for example. This technique may also be used with CQT and GKT.

United States government agencies, such as the Department of Defense, Homeland Security, Customs and Border Protection, and even the Department of Energy currently use polygraphs. They are regularly used by these agencies to screen employees.

Critics claim that "lie detection" by use of polygraphy has no scientific validity because it is not a scientific procedure. People have found ways to try and cheat the system, such as taking sedatives to reduce anxiety; using antiperspirant to prevent sweating; and positioning pins or biting parts of the mouth after each question to demonstrate a constant physiological response. As technology and research have developed many have moved away from polygraphing because of the drawbacks of this style of detection. Supporters of polygraphing claim it has a 70% accuracy rate, 16% better than lie detection in the general population. Someone who has failed the test is more likely to confess than someone who has passed, contributing to polygraph examiners not learning about mistakes they have made and thus improving.

== Voice stress analysis ==
Voice stress analysis (also called voice risk analysis) uses computers to compare pitch, frequency, intensity and micro tremors. In this way voice analysis "detect[s] minute variations in the voice thought to signal lying." It can even be used covertly over the phone, and has been used by banking and insurance companies as well as the government of the United Kingdom. Customers are assessed for truth in certain situations by banks and insurance companies where computers are used to record responses. Software then compares control questions to relevant questions assessed for deception. However, its reliability has been debated by peer-reviewed journals. "When a person lies, an involuntary interference of the nerves causes the vocal cords to produce a distorted sound wave, namely a frequency level which is different from the one produced by the same person when telling the truth."

Several studies published in peer reviewed journals showed VSA to perform at chance level when it comes to detecting deception. Horvath, McCloughan, Weatherman, and Slowik, (2013), for example, tested VSA on the recordings of interrogation of 74 suspects. Eighteen of these suspects later confessed, making the deception the most likely ground truth. With 48% accurate classification, VSA performed at chance level. Several other studies showed similar results (Damphousse, 2008; Harnsberger, Hollien, Martin, & Hollien, 2009). In 2003, the National Research Council concluded "Overall, this research and the few controlled tests conducted over the past decade offer little or no scientific basis for the use of the computer voice stress analyser or similar voice measurement instruments."

== Non-verbal behavior ==
People often evaluate lies based on non-verbal behavior, but are quick to place too much merit in misleading indicators, such as: avoidance of eye contact, increased pauses between statements, and excessive movements originating from the hands or feet. Devices such as the Silent Talker Lie Detector monitor large numbers of microexpressions over time slots and encodes them into large vectors which are classified as showing truthful or deceptive behavior by artificial intelligence or statistical classifiers.

Dr. Alan Hirsch, from the department of Neurology and Psychiatry at the Rush Presbyterian-St. Luke's Medical Center in Chicago, explained the "Pinocchio syndrome" or "Pinocchio effect" as: blood rushes to the nose when people lie. This extra blood may make the nose itchy. As a result, people who stretch the truth tend to either scratch their nose or touch it more often.

=== Eye-tracking ===
John Kircher, Doug Hacker, Anne Cook, Dan Woltz and David Raskin have developed eye-tracking technology at the University of Utah that they consider a polygraph alternative. This is not an emotional reaction like the polygraph and other methods but rather a cognitive reaction. This technology measures pupil dilation, response time, reading and rereading time, and errors. Data is recorded while subjects answer true or false questions on a computer.

They have found that more effort is required by lying than giving the truth and thus their aim is to find indications of hard work. Individuals not telling the truth might, for instance, have dilated pupils while also taking longer to answer the question.

Eye-tracking claims to offer several benefits over the polygraph: lower cost, 1/5th of the time to conduct, subjects do not need to be "hooked up" to anything, and it does not require qualified polygraph examiners to give the test. The technology has not been subject to peer review.

== Brain observations ==
Cognitive chronometry, or the measurement of the time taken to perform mental operations, can be used to distinguish lying from truth-telling. One recent instrument using cognitive chronometry for this purpose is the timed antagonistic response alethiometer, or TARA.

Brain-reading uses fMRI and the multiple voxels activated in the brain evoked by a stimulus to determine what the brain has detected, and so whether it is familiar.

Functional near-infrared spectroscopy (fNIRS) also detects oxygen and activity in the brain like the fMRI, but instead it looks at blood oxygen levels. It is advantageous to the fMRI because it is portable, however its image resolution is of lower quality than the fMRI.

As there are different styles of lying, a spontaneous or artificial deception is constructed based on a mixture of information already stored in semantic and episodic memory. It is isolated and easier to generate because it lacks cross-checking into the larger picture. This style contrasts memorized lies that aren't as rich in detail but are retrieved from memory. They often fit into an actual scenario to make recall easier.

=== Functional transcranial Doppler (fTCD) ===
Recent developments that permit non-invasive monitoring using functional transcranial Doppler (fTCD) technique showed that successful problem-solving employs a discrete knowledge strategy (DKS) that selects neural pathways represented in one hemisphere, while unsuccessful outcome implicates a non-discrete knowledge strategy (nDKS). A polygraphic test could be viewed as a working memory task. This suggests that the DKS model may have a correlate in mnemonic operations. In other words, the DKS model may have a discrete knowledge base (DKB) of essential components needed for task resolution, while for nDKS, DKB is absent and, hence, a "global" or bi-hemispheric search occurs. Based on the latter premise, a 'lie detector' system was designed as described in United States Patent No. 6,390,979. A pattern of blood-flow-velocity changes is obtained in response to questions that include correct and incorrect answers. The wrong answer will elicit bi-hemispheric activation, from correct answer that activates unilateral response. Cognitive polygraphy based on this system is devoid of any subjective control of mental processes and, hence, high reliability and specificity; however, this is yet to be tested in forensic practice. See also cognitive biometrics.

=== Event-related potentials (ERP) ===
Event-related potentials assess recognition, and therefore may or may not be effective in assessing deception. In ERP studies P3 amplitude waves are assessed, with these waves being large when an item is recognized. However, P100 amplitudes have been observed to have significant correlation to trustworthiness ratings, the importance of which will be discussed in the EEG section. This, along with other studies leads some to purport that because ERP studies rely on quick perceptual processes they "are integral to the detection of deception."

=== Electroencephalography (EEG) ===
Electroencephalography, or EEG, measures brain activity through electrodes attached to the scalp of a subject. The object is to identify the recognition of meaningful data through this activity. Images or objects are shown to the subject while questioning techniques are implemented to determine recognition. This can include crime scene images, for example.

Perceived trustworthiness is interpreted by the individual from looking at a face, and this decreases when someone is lying. Such observations are "too subtle to be explicitly processed by observers, but [do] affect implicit cognitive and affective processes." These results, in a study by Heussen, Binkofski, and Jolij, were obtained through a study with an N400 paradigm including two conditions within the experiment: truthful faces and lying faces. Faces flashed for 100ms and then the participants rated them. However, the limitations of this study would be that it only had 15 participants and the mean age was 24.

Machine learning algorithms applied to EEG data have also been used to decode whether a subject believed or disbelieved a statement reaching ~90% accuracy. This work was an extension to work by Sam Harris and colleagues and further demonstrated that belief preceded disbelief in time, suggesting that the brain may initially accept statements as valid descriptions of the world (belief) prior to rejecting this notion (disbelief). Understanding how the brain assesses the veracity of a descriptive statement may be an important step in building neuroimaging based lie detection methods.

=== Functional magnetic resonance imaging (fMRI) ===
Functional magnetic resonance imaging looks to the central nervous system to compare time and topography of activity in the brain for lie detection. While a polygraph detects changes in activity in the peripheral nervous system, fMRI has the potential to catch the lie at the source.

fMRIs use electromagnets to create pulse sequences in the cells of the brain. The fMRI scanner then detects the different pulses and fields that are used to distinguish tissue structures and the distinction between layers of the brain, matter type, and the ability to see growths. The functional component allows researchers to see activation in the brain over time and assess efficiency and connectivity by comparing blood use in the brain, which allows for the identification of which portions of the brain are using more oxygen, and thus being used during a specific task. FMRI data have been examined through the lens of machine learning algorithms to decode whether subjects believed or disbelieved statements, ranging from mathematical, semantic to religious belief statements.

Historically, fMRI lie detector tests have not been allowed into evidence in legal proceedings, the most famous attempt being Harvey Nathan's insurance fraud case in 2007. The lack of legal support has not stopped companies like No Lie MRI and CEPHOS from offering private fMRI scans to test deception. While fMRI studies on deception have claimed detection accuracy as high as 90% many have problems with implementing this style of detection. Only yes or no answers can be used which allows for flexibility in the truth and style of lying. Some people are unable to take one such as those with medical conditions, claustrophobia, or implants.

== Drugs ==
Truth drugs such as sodium thiopental, ethanol, and cannabis (historically speaking) are used for the purposes of obtaining accurate information from an unwilling subject. Information obtained by publicly disclosed truth drugs has been shown to be highly unreliable, with subjects apparently freely mixing fact and fantasy. Much of the claimed effect relies on the belief of the subjects that they cannot tell a lie while under the influence of the drug.

== See also ==
- Ecological fallacy
- Forensics in antiquity
- Thought identification
- Voice risk analysis
- Deception
