= Nonverbal communication =

Interpersonal communication through wordless (mostly visual) cues

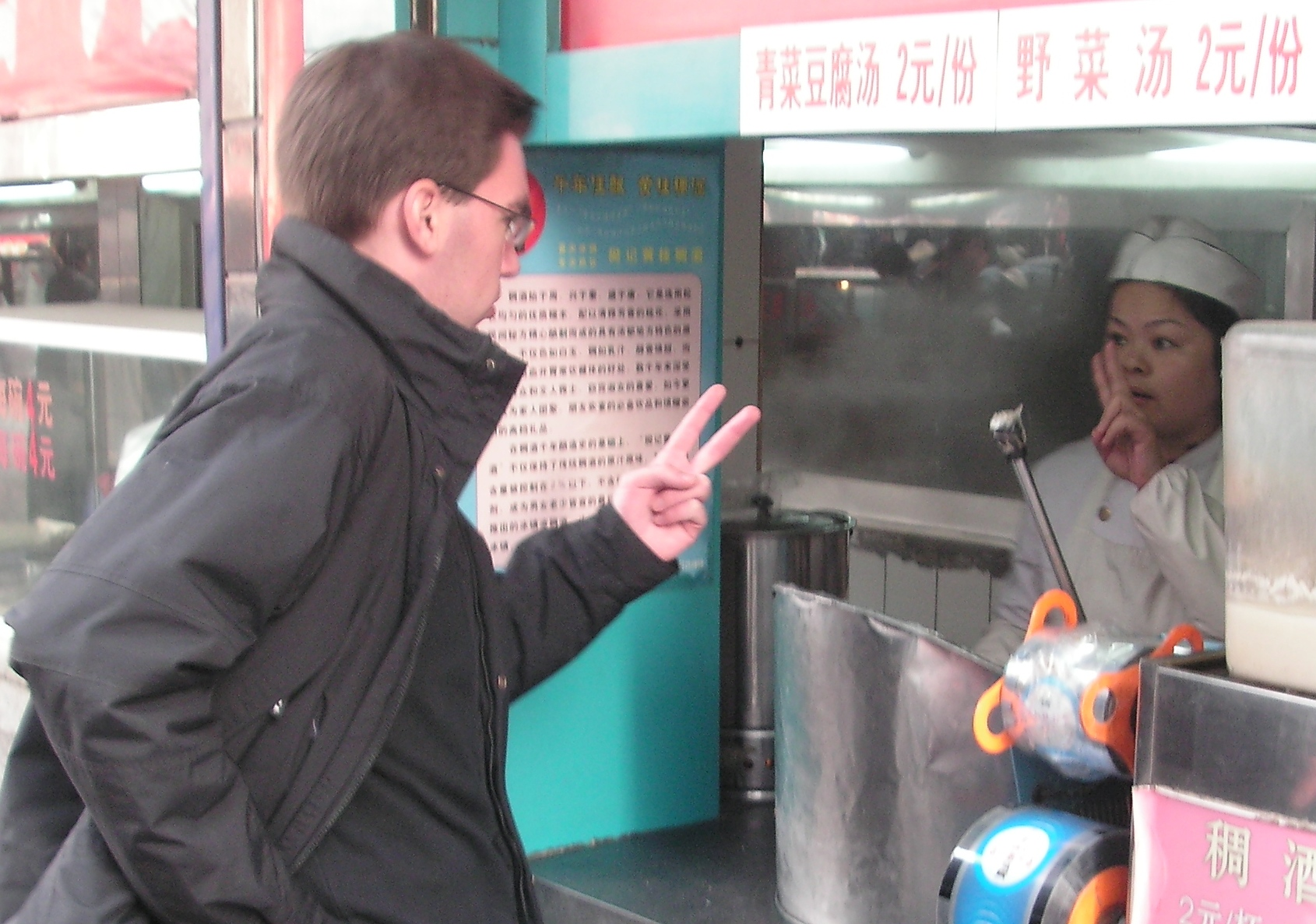
Understanding each other through hand and eye expression: the number two seen at a streetside vendor near the Bell Tower of Xi'an in China

Nonverbal communication is the transmission of messages or signals through a nonverbal platform such as eye contact (oculesics), body language (kinesics), social distance (proxemics), touch (haptics), voice (prosody and paralanguage), physical environments/appearance, and use of objects. When communicating, nonverbal channels are utilized as means to convey different messages or signals, whereas others interpret these messages.

The study of nonverbal communication started in 1872 with the publication of The Expression of the Emotions in Man and Animals by Charles Darwin. Darwin began to study nonverbal communication as he noticed the interactions between animals such as lions, tigers, dogs etc. and realized they also communicated by gestures and expressions. For the first time, nonverbal communication was studied and its relevance noted. Today, scholars argue that nonverbal communication can convey more meaning than verbal communication.

In the same way that speech incorporates nonverbal components, collectively referred to as paralanguage and encompassing voice quality, rate, pitch, loudness, and speaking style, nonverbal communication also encompasses facets of one's voice. Elements such as tone, inflection, emphasis, and other vocal characteristics contribute significantly to nonverbal communication, adding layers of meaning and nuance to the conveyed message. However, much of the study of nonverbal communication has focused on interaction between individuals, where it can be classified into three principal areas: environmental conditions where communication takes place, physical characteristics of the communicators, and behaviors of communicators during interaction.

Nonverbal communication involves the conscious and unconscious processes of encoding and decoding. Encoding is defined as our ability to express emotions in a way that can be accurately interpreted by the receiver(s). Decoding is called "nonverbal sensitivity", defined as the ability to take this encoded emotion and interpret its meanings accurately to what the sender intended. Encoding is the act of generating information such as facial expressions, gestures, and postures. Encoding information utilizes signals which we may think to be universal. Decoding is the interpretation of information from received sensations given by the encoder. Culture plays an important role in nonverbal communication, and it is one aspect that helps to influence how we interact with each other.

== Importance ==
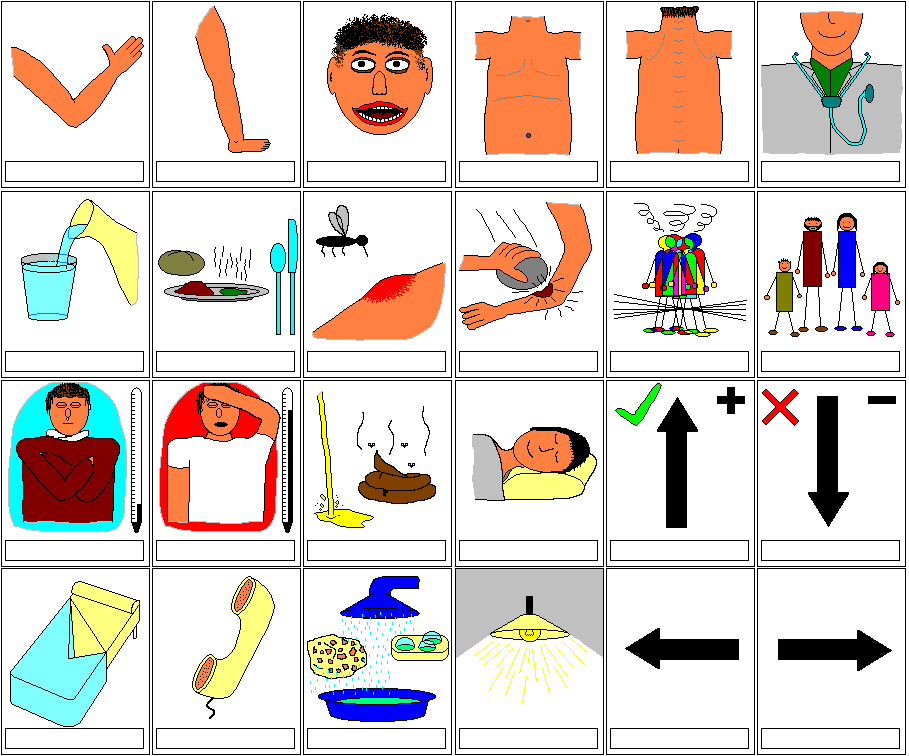
Symbol table for non-verbal communication with patients

For most communication, like giving directions, teaching math, writing books etc.. verbal information carries most of the meaning, while nonverbal communication can portray a message both vocally and with the correct body signals or gestures.

According to some authors, nonverbal communication represents 2/3 of all communication, however this statement can be misleading due to research done by Albert Mehrabian in the 1960s, which led to the famous 7-38-55 rule: 7% words (verbal content), 38% tone of voice, & 55% facial expressions—which is close to the 2/3 claim. This rule only applies in very specific situations, such as when someone is expressing feelings or attitudes, especially when words contradict tone and facial expression. Body signals consist of physical features, conscious and unconscious gestures and signals, and the mediation of personal space. The relationship and importance of verbal and nonverbal communication changes and evolves depending on the setting and situation. When verbal communication and nonverbal gestures or cues don't make sense or work well together, the person needs to consider the history and context so that they can interpret the actual meaning of the conversation.

Nonverbal communication strengthens a first impression in common situations like attracting a partner or in a business interview: impressions are on average formed within the first four seconds of contact. First encounters or interactions with another person strongly affect a person's perception. When the other person or group is absorbing the message, they are focused on the entire environment around them, meaning the other person uses all five senses in the interaction: 83% sight, 11% hearing, 3% smell, 2% touch and 1% taste.

According to Judee K. Burgoon et al., further reasons for the importance of non-verbal communication are:

- "Non-verbal communication is omnipresent." They are included in every single communication act. To have total communication, all non-verbal channels such as the body, face, voice, appearance, touch, distance, timing, and other environmental forces must be engaged during face-to-face interaction. Written communication can also have non-verbal attributes. E-mails, web chats, and the social media have options to change text font colours, stationery, add emoticons, capitalization, and pictures in order to capture non-verbal cues into a verbal medium.
- "Non-verbal behaviours are multifunctional." Many different non-verbal channels are engaged at the same time in communication acts and allow the chance for simultaneous messages to be sent and received.
- "Non-verbal behaviours may form a universal language system." Smiling, crying, pointing, caressing, and glaring are non-verbal behaviours that are used and understood by people regardless of nationality. Such non-verbal signals allow the most basic form of communication when verbal communication is not effective due to language barriers.

=== Practical applications ===
Comparative research on nonverbal communication in animals has been used to inform how researchers study the exchange of emotional signals between a sender and a receiver in humans. This leads to a better understanding of how humans communicate with each other. Facial expressions are a well-studied nonverbal channel for conveying emotion, including through microexpressions: brief, involuntary facial movements, often lasting a fraction of a second, that can reveal a feeling the person is not consciously expressing. Interpreting such cues accurately can depend on cultural context, since norms around touch, tone, and pitch vary between cultures and can lead to misunderstanding if misread.

Verbal and nonverbal signals can either reinforce or contradict one another, and this affects how clearly a message is understood. Physicians' nonverbal behaviour in consultations affects patient satisfaction, understanding, and malpractice risk, prompting concern that increased computer use during consultations (for example, to update electronic health records) can reduce eye contact and other nonverbal engagement with patients. Structured tools such as the E.M.P.A.T.H.Y. framework (eye contact, muscles of facial expression, posture, affect, tone of voice, hearing the whole patient, and your response) have been developed to help clinicians and trainees systematically attend to nonverbal cues; the framework was the basis of a randomized controlled trial in empathy training at Massachusetts General Hospital.

In medical education, nonverbal communication is taught and assessed as an explicit part of doctor–patient communication skills training, alongside interview technique and empathy. A 2026 scoping review of 121 studies found that digital technologies, including video-recording-based tools, are increasingly used for this training, with a small subset of studies using AI-supported analysis to give learners automated feedback specifically on nonverbal behavior. The review noted, however, that only a minority of studies used validated outcome measures and that evidence for translation into real-world clinical performance remained limited.

== History of research ==
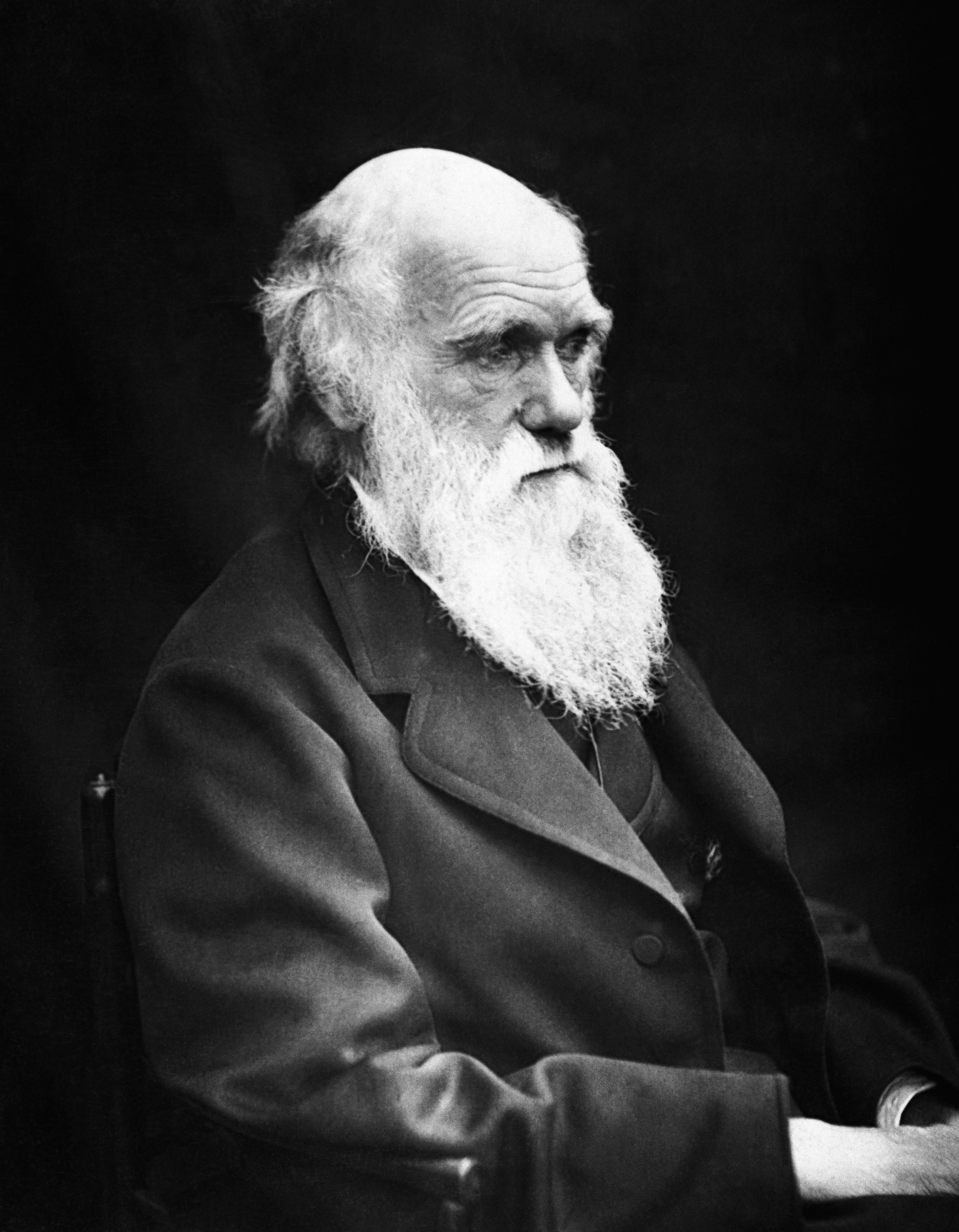
Charles Darwin wrote The Expression of the Emotions in Man and Animals in 1872.

Scientific research on nonverbal communication and behavior was started in 1872 with the publication of Charles Darwin's book, The Expression of the Emotions in Man and Animals. Charles Darwin was a renowned British naturalist and biologist best known for developing the theory of evolution through natural selection. In his book, Darwin argued that all mammals, both humans and animals, showed emotion through facial expressions. He posed questions such as: "Why do our facial expressions of emotions take the particular forms they do?" and "Why do we wrinkle our nose when we are disgusted and bare our teeth when we are enraged?" Darwin attributed these facial expressions to serviceable associated habits, which are behaviors that earlier in our evolutionary history had specific and direct functions.

In response to the question asking why facial expressions persist even when they no longer serve their original purposes, Darwin's predecessors have developed a highly valued explanation. According to Darwin, humans continue to make facial expressions because they have acquired communicative value throughout evolutionary history. In other words, humans utilize facial expressions as external evidence of their internal state. Although The Expression of the Emotions in Man and Animals was not one of Darwin's most successful books in terms of its quality and overall impact in the field, his initial ideas started the abundance of research on the types, effects, and expressions of nonverbal communication and behavior.

Behaviorism is defined as the theory of learning that describes people's behavior as acquired through conditioning. Behaviorists such as B.F. Skinner trained pigeons to engage in various behaviors to demonstrate how animals engage in behaviors with rewards.

While most psychology researchers were exploring behaviorism, the study of nonverbal communication as recorded on film began in 1955–56 at the Center for Advanced Study in Behavioral Sciences through a project which came to be called the Natural History of an Interview. The initial participants included two psychiatrists, Frieda Fromm-Reichman and Henry Brosin, two linguists, Norman A. McQuown and Charles Hockett, and also two anthropologists, Clyde Kluckhohn and David M. Schneider (these last two withdrew by the end of 1955, and did not participate in the major group project). In their place, two other anthropologists, Ray Birdwhistell, already then known as the founder of kinesics, the study of body motion communication, and Gregory Bateson, known more generally as a human communication theorist, both joined the team in 1956. Albert Scheflen and Adam Kendon were among those who joined one of the small research teams continuing research once the year at CASBS ended. The project analyzed a film made by Bateson, using an analytic method called at the time natural history, and later, mostly by Scheflen, context analysis. The result remained unpublished, as it was enormous and unwieldy, but it was available on microfilm by 1971. The method involves transcribing filmed or videotaped behavior in excruciating detail, and was later used in studying the sequence and structure of human greetings, social behaviors at parties, and the function of posture during interpersonal interaction.

Despite the introduction of nonverbal communication in the 1800s, the emergence of behaviorism in the 1920s paused further research on nonverbal communication. However, research on nonverbal communication rocketed once again during the mid-1960s by a number of psychologists and researchers. Ralph V. Exline examined patterns of looking while speaking and looking while listening. Eckhard Hess produced several studies pertaining to pupil dilation that were published in Scientific American. Robert Sommer studied the relationship between personal space and the environment. Robert Rosenthal discovered that expectations made by teachers and researchers can influence their outcomes, and that subtle, nonverbal cues may play an important role in this process. Albert Mehrabian studied the nonverbal cues of liking and immediacy. By the 1970s, a number of scholarly volumes in psychology summarized the growing body of research, such as Shirley Weitz's Nonverbal Communication and Marianne LaFrance and Clara Mayo's Moving Bodies. Popular books included Body Language (Fast, 1970), which focused on how to use nonverbal communication to attract other people, and How to Read a Person Like a Book (Nierenberg & Calero, 1971) which examined nonverbal behavior in negotiation situations. The journal Environmental Psychology and Nonverbal Behavior was founded in 1976.

In 1970, Argyle hypothesized that although spoken language is used for communicating the meaning about events external to the person communicating, the nonverbal codes are used to create and strengthen interpersonal relationships. When someone wishes to avoid conflicting or embarrassing events during communication, it is considered proper and correct by the hypothesis to communicate attitudes towards others non-verbally instead of verbally. Michael Argyle and Janet Dean Fodor, for example, studied the relationship between eye contact and conversational distance. Along with this philosophy, Michael Argyle also found and concluded in 1988 that there are five main functions of nonverbal body behavior and gestures in human communications: self-presentation of one's whole personality, rituals and cultural greetings, expressing interpersonal attitudes, expressing emotions, and to accompany speech in managing the cues set in the interactions between the speaker and the listener.

Beliefs surrounding nonverbal communication continue to evolve, and these behaviors go deeper than just body language and facial expressions. Misconceptions made by knowledgeable psychologists and laypersons alike show 3 main topics regularly mistaken. Research challenges the assumption that personal space is fixed, suggesting that it varies based on cultural context, relationships, and situational factors. Another point recognized to be false is that facial expressions universally reveal inner emotions. On the contrary, facial expressions may be shaped by an individual's culture or social gaps, meaning they may not be a gateway to specific emotions often associated with obvious signs. A third misconception elaborates on the idea that the body never lies, and nonverbal cues effectively reveal deception. Debunked by other professionals, these behaviors do not always provide hidden insight into a person's truthfulness.

== First impression ==
Some say that it takes just one-tenth of a second for someone to judge and make their first impression. According to a study from Princeton University, this short amount of time is enough for a person to determine several attributes about an individual. These attributes included "attractiveness, likeability, trustworthiness, competence, and aggressiveness." The way a person portrays themselves on the first encounter is non-verbal statement to the observer. Presentation can include clothing and other visible attributes such as facial expressions or facial traits in general. Negative impressions can also be based on presentation and on personal prejudice. First impressions, although sometimes misleading, can in many situations be an accurate depiction of others. In terms of culture, collectivists have a harder time changing their first impressions because they emphasize a lot more context and need additional time when faced with new clues as each view may be correct in some contexts.

== Posture ==
Posture is a nonverbal cue that is associated with positioning. Posture and positioning are sources of information about individual's characteristics, attitudes, and feelings about themselves and other people. The posture or bodily stance an individual exhibits (slouching, towering, legs spread, jaw thrust, shoulders forward, and arm crossing) can portray a variety of messages. A study, for instance, identified around 200 postures that are related to maladjustment and withholding of information.

Posture can be used to determine a participant's degree of attention or involvement, the difference in status between communicators, and the level of fondness a person has for the other communicator, depending on body "openness". It can also be effectively used as a way for an individual to convey a desire to increase, limit, or avoid interaction with another person. Studies investigating the impact of posture on interpersonal relationships suggest that mirror-image congruent postures, where one person's left side is parallel to the other person's right side, leads to favorable perception of communicators and positive speech; a person who displays a forward lean or decreases a backward lean also signifies positive sentiment during communication. People will change their posture relative to the situation they are in. This can be demonstrated in the case of relaxed posture when an individual is within a nonthreatening situation and the way one's body tightens or become rigid when under stress.

== Clothing ==
Clothing is one of the most common forms of non-verbal communication. The study of clothing and other objects as a means of non-verbal communication is known as artifactics or objectics. The types of clothing that an individual wears convey nonverbal cues about their personality, background and financial status, and how others will respond to them. An individual's clothing style can demonstrate their culture, mood, level of confidence, interests, age, authority, nationality and values/beliefs.

Aside from communicating a person's beliefs and nationality, clothing can be used as a nonverbal cue to attract others. Men and women may shower themselves with accessories and high-end fashion to attract partners interested. In this case, clothing is a form of self-expression where people can flaunt their power, wealth, sex appeal, or creativity. A study of the clothing worn by women attending discothèques, carried out in Vienna, Austria. It showed that in certain groups of women (especially women who were without their partners), motivation for sex and levels of sexual hormones were correlated with aspects of their clothing, especially the amount of skin displayed and the presence of sheer clothing. The University of North Carolina studied how undergraduate women chose to dress and their personality types. The study showed that women dressed "primarily for comfort and practicality were more self-controlled, dependable, and socially well adjusted." Women who did not like to stand out in a crowd typically had more conservative and traditional views and beliefs. Clothing, although non-verbal, tells people what the individual's personality is. The way a person dresses is typically rooted in deeper internal motivations such as emotions, experiences, and culture. Clothing expresses who they are or who they want to be that day. It shows other people who they want to be associated with and where they fit in. Clothing can start relationships because they clue other people into the wearer.

Group colors and clothing are commonly used to represent affiliation. This is why, when it comes to the clothing that they wear, nonverbal communication with gangs is very common. Gang members typically wear 2–3 colors to signify that they are representing a particular neighborhood. Baseball caps and hats with specific gang names and initials, worn backwards, tilted, in certain colors, etc. bandanas worn around the head, shoulders, arms, or legs. Gang members frequently dress in hip-hop-inspired fashions, such as oversized pants worn below the waist (also known as "sagging"). Colored belts, colored shoes, and colored bandanas are all utilized as identifiers.

== Gestures ==
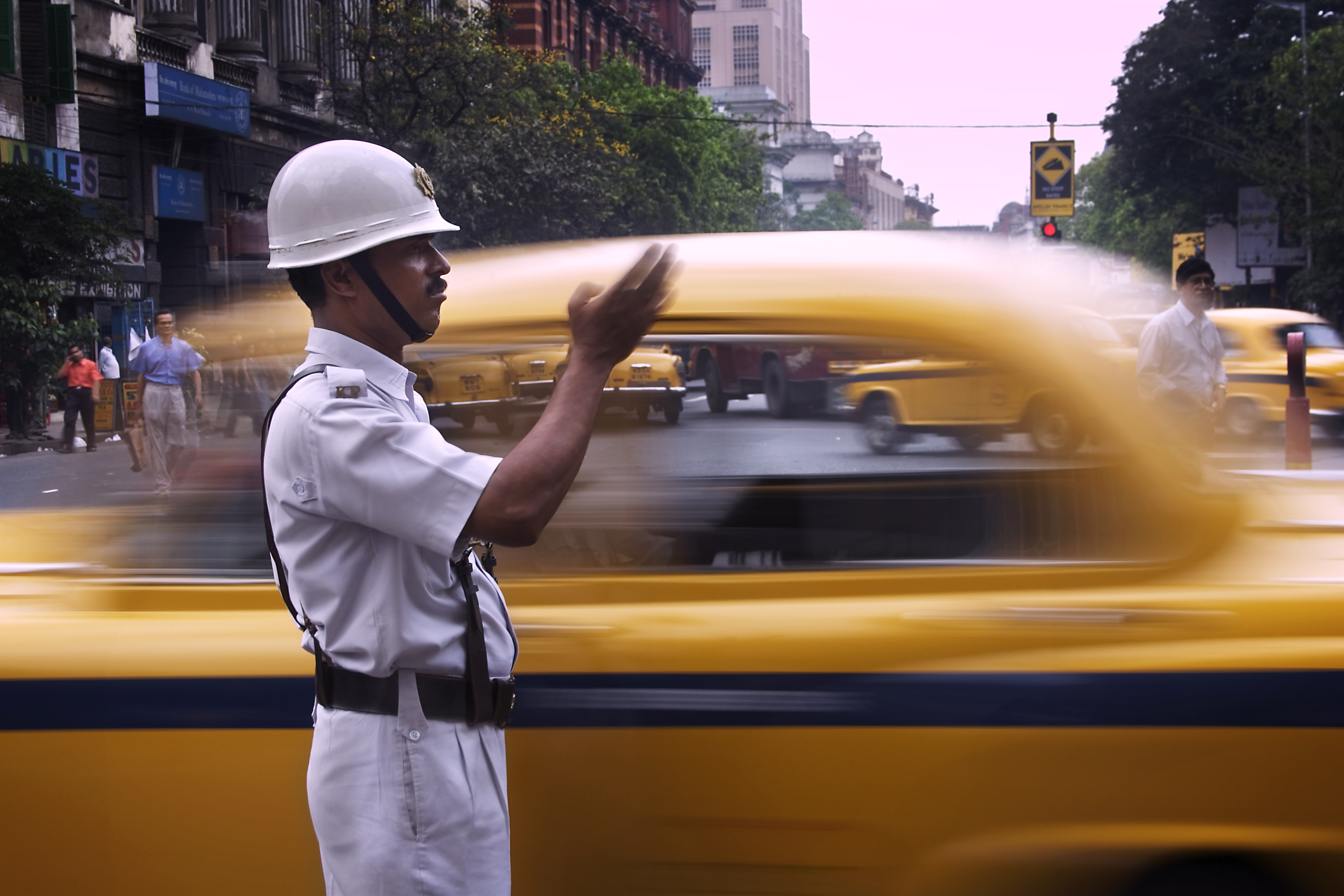
Policeman directing traffic by gesture

Although the study of gesture is still in its infancy, some broad categories of gestures have been identified by researchers. The most familiar are the so-called emblems or quotable gestures. These are conventional, culture-specific gestures that can be used as replacement for words,Gestures may be made with the hands, arms or body, and also include movements of the head, face and eyes, such as winking, nodding, or rolling one's eyes. A single emblematic gesture can have a very different significance in different cultural contexts, ranging from complimentary to highly offensive. For a list of emblematic gestures, see List of gestures. There are some universal gestures like the shoulder shrug.

Gestures can also be categorized as either speech independent or speech related. Speech-independent gestures are dependent upon culturally accepted interpretation and have a direct verbal translation. Speech-related gestures are used in parallel with verbal speech; this form of nonverbal communication is used to emphasize the message that is being communicated. These gestures are intended to provide supplemental information to a verbal message such as pointing to an object of discussion.

Gestures are not just for the audience but can also help the speaker elaborate their thoughts, and process their ideas more fluently. Facial expressions serve as a means of communication. With the various muscles that precisely control mouth, lips, eyes, nose, forehead, and jaw, human faces are estimated to be capable of more than ten thousand different expressions. This versatility makes non-verbals of the face extremely efficient and honest, unless deliberately manipulated. In addition, many of these emotions, including happiness, sadness, anger, fear, surprise, disgust, shame, anguish and interest are universally recognized.

Displays of emotions can generally be categorized into two groups: negative and positive. Negative emotions usually manifest as increased tension in various muscle groups: tightening of jaw muscles, furrowing of forehead, squinting eyes, or lip occlusion (when the lips seemingly disappear). In contrast, positive emotions are revealed by the loosening of the furrowed lines on the forehead, relaxation of the muscles around the mouth, and widening of the eye area. When individuals are truly relaxed and at ease, the head will also tilt to the side, exposing our most vulnerable area, the neck. This is a high-comfort display, often seen during courtship, that is nearly impossible to mimic when tense or suspicious.

Gestures can be subdivided into three groups:

=== Adapters ===
Some hand movements are not considered to be gestures. These are the kinds of scratching, fidgeting, rubbing, tapping, and touching that people often do with their hands. These behaviors can show that a person is experiencing anxiety or feeling of discomfort, typical when the individual is not the one in control of the conversation or situation and therefore expresses this uneasiness subconsciously. Such behaviors are referred to as adapters. They may not be perceived as meaningfully related to the speech in which they accompany, but may serve as the basis for dispositional inferences of the speaker's emotion (nervous, uncomfortable, bored.)

=== Symbolic ===
Other hand movements are gestures. They are movements with specific, conventionalized meanings called symbolic gestures. They are the exact opposite of adaptors, since their meanings are intended to be communicated and they have a specific meaning for the person who gives the gesture and the person to receive it. In contrast to adapters, symbolic gestures are used intentionally and serve a clear communicative function. Sign languages are highly developed systems of symbolic gesture. Some educators that work with deaf learners use a combination of cued speech and lip speaking and reading that helps deaf and hard hearing individuals (D/HH) to code and decode words based on their phonetics. In addition to the supplementary aspect of the cues like location and movement, every culture has their own set of gestures, some of which are unique only to a specific culture. For example, the phonological and lexical repository of D/HH individuals is highly dependent on their social background and richness of language. Very similar gestures can have very different meanings across cultures. Symbolic gestures are usually used in the absence of speech but can also accompany speech.

=== Conversational ===
The middle ground between adapters and symbolic gestures is occupied by conversational gestures. These gestures do not refer to actions or words but do accompany speech. Conversational gestures are hand movements that accompany speech and are related to the speech they accompany. There are a few types of conversational gestures, specifically motor and lexical movements. Motor movements are those which are rhythmical and repetitive, do not have to be accompanied by anything spoken due to their simple meaning, and the speaker's hand usually sticks to one position. When paired with verbal communication, they can be used to stress certain syllables. An example of this would be pointing someone in the direction of an individual and saying, "That way." In this case, the "That" in the sentence would be stressed by the movements. Lexical movements are more complex, not rhythmic, or repetitive, but rather lengthy and varied. An example of this would be something like giving elaborate directions to somewhere and pairing that with various hands movements to signal the various turns to take.

== Distance ==
According to Edward T. Hall, the amount of space we maintain between ourselves and the persons with whom we are communicating shows the importance of the science of proxemics. In this process, it is seen how we feel towards the others at that particular time. Within American culture Hall defines four primary distance zones: (i) intimate (touching to eighteen inches [0–46 centimetres]) distance, (ii) personal (eighteen inches to four feet, [0.46–1.22 metres]) distance, (iii) social (four to twelve feet [1.22–3.66 metres]) distance, and (iv) public (more than twelve feet [3.66 metres]) distance. Intimate distance is considered appropriate for familiar relationships and indicates closeness and trust. Personal distance is still close but keeps another "at arm's length" and is considered the most comfortable distance for most of our interpersonal contact, while social distance is used for the kind of communication that occurs in business relationships and, sometimes, in the classroom. Public distance occurs in situations where two-way communication is not desirable or possible.

Proxemics plays a crucial role in getting to know someone. Imagine two individuals sitting at a small dinner table. One person is motivated by romantic interest, and begins to lean in, expecting closeness. However, the other person, who does not share the same romantic feelings, perceives this behavior as a breach of social norms. They expected the interaction to remain within personal distance, a more appropriate zone for acquaintances or casual dates. As a result, they may respond by showing visible signals of discomfort.

In addition, to social expectations, culture can play a role in proxemics. People from different cultures have different comfort zones when it comes to personal space (Chen & Starosta, 2005). In everyday conversations, people from places like North Africa, and parts of the Middle East usually feel fine standing closer to others, while people from Japan and China often prefer more space between themselves and others. Not understanding these differences can make cross-cultural interactions feel awkward or uncomfortable.

== Eye contact ==
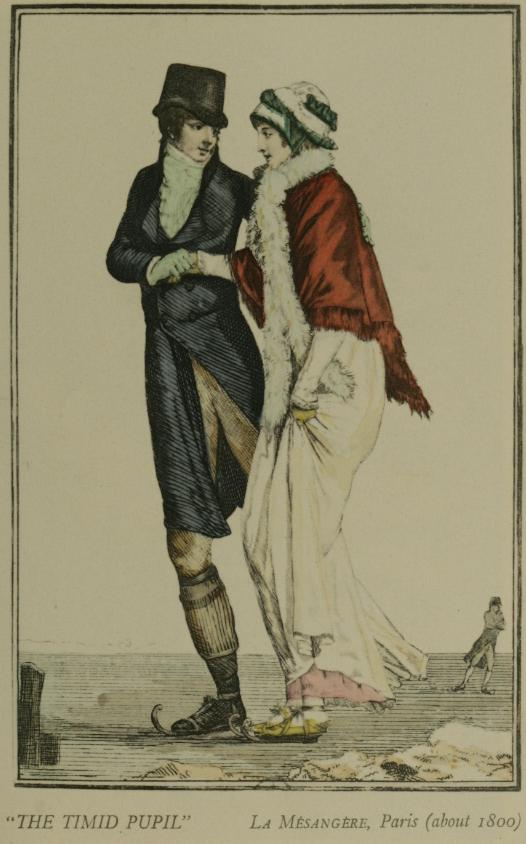
Information about the relationship and affect of these two skaters is communicated by their body posture, eye gaze and physical contact.

Eye contact is the instance when two people look at each other's eyes at the same time, and is the primary nonverbal way of indicating engagement, interest, attention and involvement. According to Eckman, "Eye contact (also called mutual gaze) is another major channel of nonverbal communication.

Nonverbal communication involves the conscious and unconscious processes of encoding and decoding. Encoding is defined as our ability to express emotions in a way that the receiver(s). Decoding is called "nonverbal sensitivity", defined as the ability to take this encoded emotion and interpret its meanings accurately to what the sender intended. Encoding is the act of generating information such as facial expressions, gestures, and postures. Some studies have demonstrated that people use their eyes to indicate interest. This includes frequently recognized actions of winking and movements of the eyebrows. Disinterest is highly noticeable when little or no eye contact is made in a social setting. When an individual is interested, however, the pupils will dilate.The duration of eye contact is its most meaningful aspect." Generally speaking, the longer there is established eye contact between two people, the greater the intimacy levels. Gaze comprises the actions of looking while talking and listening. The length of a gaze, the frequency of glances, patterns of fixation, pupil dilation, and blink rate are all important cues in nonverbal communication. According to Descroix et al., the context of conversations does not produce long blinks between the emitter and the recipient. "Liking generally increases as mutual gazing increases."

Along with the detection of disinterest, deceit can also be observed in a person. Hogan states "when someone is being deceptive their eyes tend to blink a lot more. Eyes act as leading indicator of truth or deception," Both nonverbal and verbal cues are useful when detecting deception. It is commonly believed that those who are lying and those who are telling the truth possess different forms of nonverbal and verbal cues. Understanding the cultural background of a person will influence how easily deception is detectable because nonverbal cues may differ depending on the culture. In addition to eye contact these nonverbal cues can consist of physiological aspects including pulse rate as well as levels of perspiration. As Pease states, "Give the amount of eye contact that makes everyone feel comfortable. Unless looking at others is a cultural no-no, lookers gain more credibility than non-lookers"

In concealing deception, nonverbal communication makes it easier to lie without being revealed. This is the conclusion of a study where people watched made-up interviews of persons accused of having stolen a wallet. The interviewees lied in about 50% of the cases. People had access to either written transcript of the interviews, or audio tape recordings, or video recordings. The more clues that were available to those watching, the larger was the trend that interviewees who actually lied were judged to be truthful. That is, people that are clever at lying can use tone of voice and facial expressions to give the impression that they are truthful. Contrary to popular belief, a liar does not always avoid eye contact. In an attempt to be more convincing, liars deliberately made more eye contact with interviewers than those that were telling the truth. However, there are many cited examples of cues to deceit, delivered via nonverbal (paraverbal and visual) communication channels, through which deceivers supposedly unwittingly provide clues to their concealed knowledge or actual opinions. Most studies examining the nonverbal cues to deceit rely upon human coding of video footage (c.f. Vrij, 2008), although a recent study also demonstrated bodily movement differences between truth-tellers and liars using an automated body motion capture system.

== Scent ==
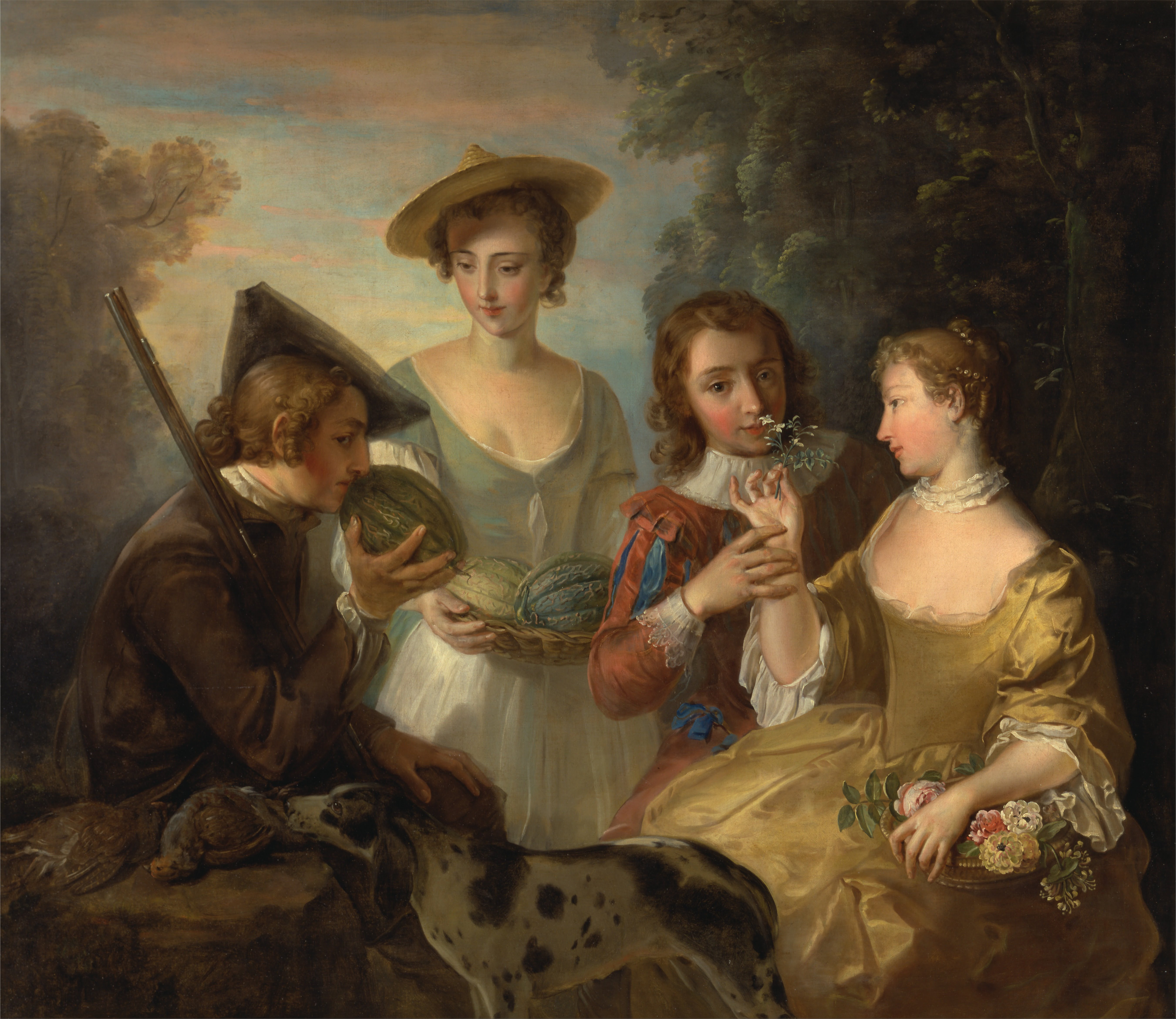
Sharing the sense of smell

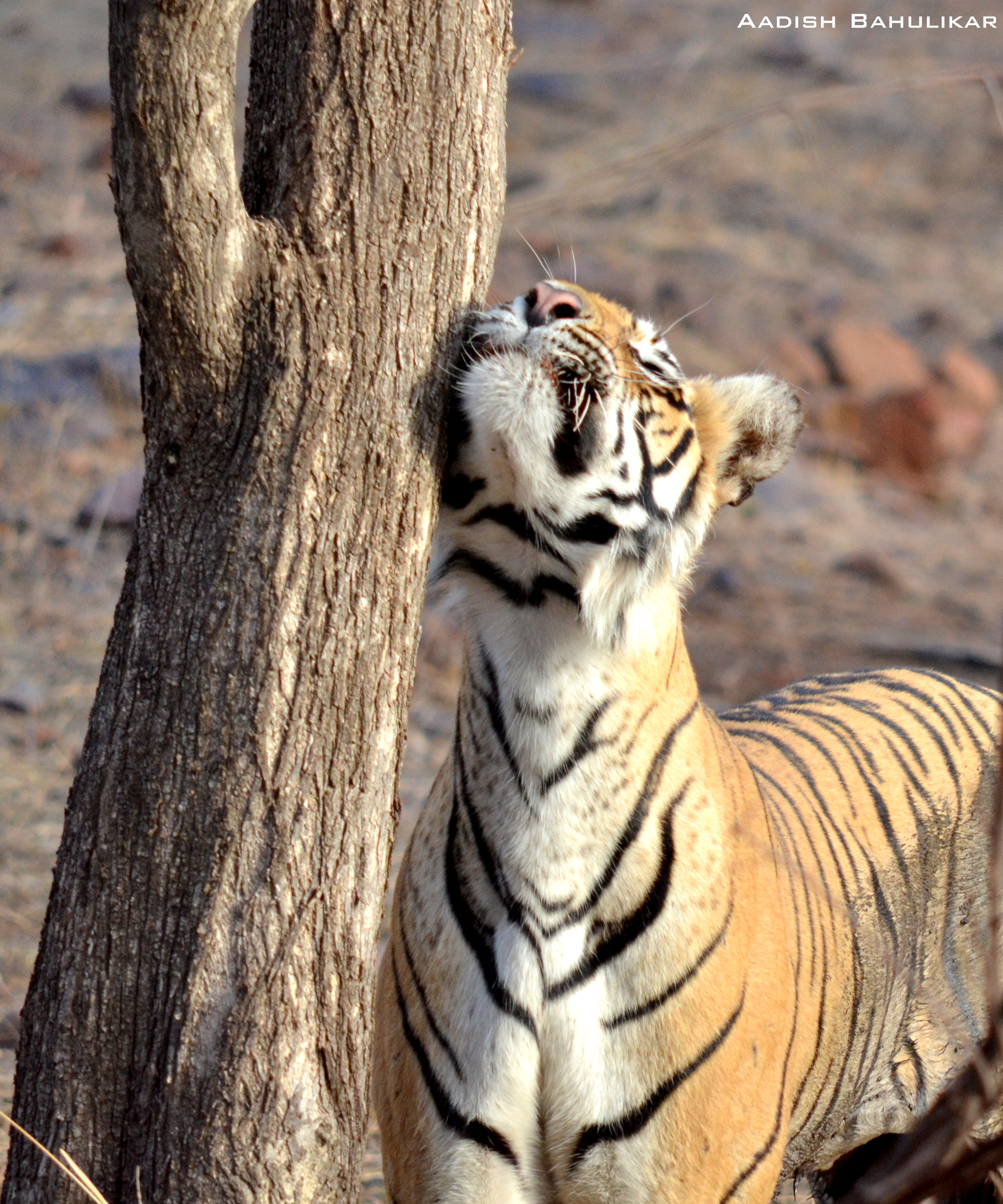
A tigress scent-rubbing on a tree

Olfactic communication is a channel of nonverbal communication referring to the various ways people and animals communicate and engage in social interaction through their sense of smell. The human olfactory sense is one of the most phylogenetically primitive and emotionally intimate of the five senses; the sensation of smell is thought to be the most matured and developed human sense.

Human ancestors essentially depended on their sense of smell to alert themselves of danger such as poisonous food and to locate potent mating partners. Using the sense of smell as an instrument paved a way for smell to become a platform of nonverbal communication. Smell also has a significant influence on social interactions. Through their branch of olfaction research, the National Science Foundation recorded that over 70 percent of American adults believe a person's body odor has a significant effect on how interested they will be when conversing with people of a different sex. This process is possible with olfactory bulbs, the part of the brain that discriminates and enhances certain odors. Typically, women will prefer men whose natural odor is similar to their own, while heterosexual men are attracted to females with high estrogen levels and strong menstrual secretions. An entire industry has been developed to provide people with personal smell-masking products, such as perfume, cologne, deodorant, and scented lotions. When a person covers their natural body odor with a pleasant smell, they are communicating their desire to be attractive either emotionally, sexually, or romantically.

== Vocalics ==
Nonverbal communication stands in contrast to communication through words, but includes other aspects of the speech signal. In particular, prosody, and in particular vocalics, plays a very important part in nonverbal communication. Prosodic properties such as tempo, volume, inflection, pauses, and pitch can combine to communicate emotion and attitude without using specific words. Vocalics also includes emblems, or sounds with specific meanings, such as vocalizing "brrr" when cold, and mental-state indicators, like "hmm" when thinking about something, and other nonlexical but meaningful sounds. These sounds are often accompanied by other nonverbal cues.Vocalics can heavily influence communication through its many different cues.

Infants heavily rely on nonverbal vocalics to communicate their needs. As caregivers talk with their baby, the baby can pick up intonation as well start to mimic and use it themselves. As they go on, babies can pick up more and learn how to develop their own voices and vocalics. Furthermore, in a study highlighted by Pearce and Conklin, they found that changing the vocalics of an audio recording of the same speech gave different results of liking. When the speaker gave his speech as more conversational instead of dynamic, he was deemed more trust worthy.

== Online ==
Online nonverbal communication is through an online, digital medium, such as text messaging, social media, and video calling. Whilst it may differ from face-to-face communication and cues, it retains similar importance when it comes to relaying information between individuals. Elements such as Emojis and GIFs provide crucial information of context or emotion to aid in understanding despite the physical barrier when text messaging. These elements are incredibly important in helping to understand tone and intention when communicating through a digital medium. In video, cues like gestures, facial expressions, and body language are observed to be displayed stronger than usual to properly articulate emotion and meaning. Nonverbal cues being used through online mediums have been observed enhancing social presence, or the showcasing of personal characteristics within an online community, by giving personal or emotional information and contributing to engagement in online environments.

== Across cultures ==
=== Overview ===
While not traditionally thought of as "talk," nonverbal communication has been found to contain highly precise and symbolic meanings, similar to verbal speech. However the meanings in nonverbal communication are conveyed through the use of gesture, posture changes, and timing. Nuances across different aspects of nonverbal communication can be found in cultures all around the world. These differences can often lead to miscommunication between people of different cultures, who usually do not mean to offend. Differences can be based in preferences for mode of communication, like the Chinese, who typically prefer silence over verbal communication. Differences can even be based on how cultures perceive the passage of time.

Chronemics, how people handle time, can be categorized in two ways: polychronic which is when people do many activities at once and is common in Italy and Spain, or monochronic which is when people do one thing at a time which is common in America. Because nonverbal communication can vary across many axes—gestures, gaze, clothing, posture, direction, or even environmental cues like lighting—there is a lot of room for cultural differences. One of the main factors that differentiates nonverbal communication in cultures is high and low-context. Context relates to certain events and the meaning that is ultimately derived from it. "High-context" cultures rely mostly on nonverbal cues and gestures, using elements such as the closeness of the kind of the relationships they have with others, strict social hierarchies and classes and deep cultural tradition and widely known beliefs and rules. In contrast, "low-context" cultures depend largely on words and verbal communication, where communications are direct and social hierarchies are way less tense and more loose.

=== Gestures ===
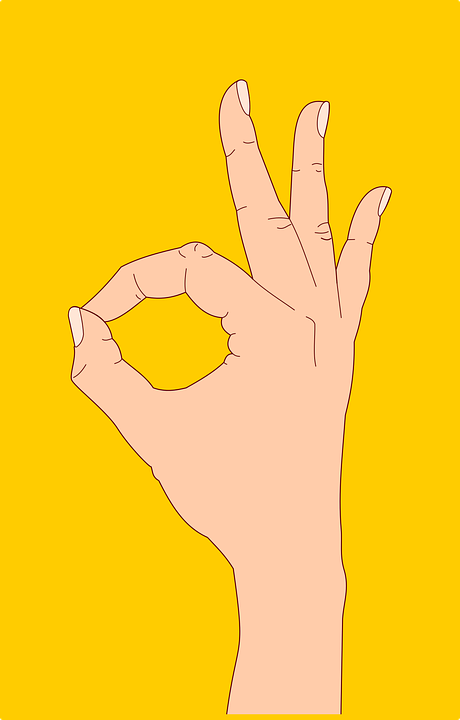
This gesture is accepted by Dutch people as meaning "brilliant", but varies greatly in other cultures around the world, and is ubiquitous in emoji culture.

Gestures vary widely across cultures in how they are used and what they mean. Common examples include pointing, sticking one's tongue out, clapping, and head nodding. Some cultures consider pointing to be rude, while it is commonly used in the United States to give directions or beckon someone. Those from Asian cultures typically use their entire hand to point to something. In Western countries, sticking one's tongue out can be seen as mockery, but in Polynesia it serves as a greeting and a sign of reverence. Clapping is a North American way of applauding, but in Spain is used to summon a waiter at a restaurant. Differences in nodding and shaking the head to indicate agreement and disagreement also exist. Northern Europeans nodding their heads up and down to say "yes", and shaking their head from side to side to say "no". But the Greeks have for at least three thousand years used the upward nod for disagreement and the downward nod for agreement. There are many ways of waving goodbye: Americans face the palm outward and move the hand side to side, Italians face the palm inward and move the fingers facing the other person, French and Germans face the hand horizontal and move the fingers toward the person leaving.

Gestures are used in more informal settings and more often by children. People in the United States commonly use the "OK" hand gesture to give permission and allow an action. In Japan, however, the same sign means "money". It refers to "zero" or "nothing" in several cultures besides these two (Argentina, Belgium, French and the Portuguese). To Eastern European cultures that same "OK" sign is considered a vulgar swearing gesture. In certain Commonwealth cultures, the index and middle fingers only extended with the palm pointing outwards can be an insulting gesture, while in others it simply means the number "two" or the "V for Victory" sign, while the same sign with the palm pointing inwards means "peace" in some cultures.

==== Speech-independent gestures ====
Speech-independent gestures are nonverbal cues that communicate a word or an expression, most commonly a dictionary definition. For example, a nose wrinkle could universally mean disapproval or disgust. Though differences in this area exist between cultures, speech-independent gestures must have a common understanding among people affiliated with that culture or subculture. As most people use gestures to better clarify their speech, speech-independent gestures do not rely on speech for their meaning. Usually they transpire into a single gesture. Depending on the culture, a nod or head bobble can indicate understanding while the speaker is talking. Even though speech-independent gestures are independent of speech, it may still require context to fully interpret. Gestures with the middle finger may be used within different contexts, comical or derogatory: the only way to know is if one analyzes the other behaviors surrounding it and depending on who the speaker is and who the speaker is addressing.

=== Displays of emotion ===

Emotions are a key factor in nonverbal communication. Just as gestures and other hand movements vary across cultures, so does the way people display their emotions. For example, "In many cultures, such as the Arab and Iranian cultures, people express grief openly. They mourn out loud, while in Asian cultures, the general belief is that it is unacceptable to show emotion openly." For people in Westernized countries, laughter is a sign of amusement, but in some parts of Africa it is a sign of wonder or embarrassment. Emotional expression varies with culture. Native Americans tend to be more reserved and less expressive with emotions. Frequent touches are common for Chinese people; however, such actions like touching, patting, hugging or kissing in America are less frequent and not often publicly displayed.According to Rebecca Bernstein (from Point Park University) "Winking is a facial expression particularly varied in meaning." According to Latin culture, a wink was a display or invitation of romantic pursuit. The Yoruba (Nigeria) have taught their children to follow certain nonverbal commands, such as winking, which tells them it is time to leave the room. To the Chinese it comes off as an offensive gesture.

Emotional expression as touch between different levels of relationships can vary upon culture as well. Within Japanese culture, touch is something that is uncommon when speaking to another person, particularly friends or acquaintances. By contrast, within South American and South European cultures, frequent contact between people, even if they have just met, is commonplace and showcases a differing emphasis on physical contact as hospitality. Edward T. Hall's foundational models of cultures that are high- and low-contact relates to contact in cultures when it comes to emotional expression through proxemics. This cultural difference in how emotions are expressed through nonverbal communication comes from perceptions and expectations, particularly in public. For example, within the Japanese culture, crowding is common and people who are close show it through physical proximity. By contrast, in Middle Eastern culture, space between individuals, is held more sacred and commonplace.

=== Nonverbal actions ===
According to Matsumoto and Juang, the nonverbal motions of different people indicate important channels of communication. Nonverbal actions should match and harmonize with the message being portrayed, otherwise confusion will occur. For instance, an individual would normally not be seen smiling and gesturing broadly when saying a sad message. The author states that nonverbal communication is very important to be aware of, especially if comparing gestures, gaze, and tone of voice amongst different cultures. As Latin American cultures embrace big speech gestures, Middle Eastern cultures are relatively more modest in public and are not expressive. Within cultures, different rules are made about staring or gazing. Women may especially avoid eye contact with men because it can be taken as a sign of sexual interest. Voice is a category that changes within cultures. Depending on whether or not the cultures is expressive or non-expressive, many variants of the voice can depict different reactions.

In Latin America and the Middle East the acceptable distance is much shorter than what most Europeans and Americans feel comfortable with. This is why an American or a European might wonder why the other person is invading their personal space by standing so close, while the other person might wonder why the American/European is standing so far from them. In addition, for Latin Americans, the French, Italians, and Arabs the distance between people is much closer than the distance for Americans; in general for these close distance groups, 1 foot of distance is for lovers, 1.5–4 feet of distance is for family and friends, and 4–12 feet is for strangers. In the opposite way, most Native Americans value distance to protect themselves.

=== Children's learning in indigenous American communities ===
Nonverbal communication is commonly used to facilitate learning in indigenous American communities. Nonverbal communication is pivotal for collaborative participation in shared activities, as children from indigenous American communities will learn how to interact using nonverbal communication by intently observing adults. Nonverbal communication allows for continuous keen observation and signals to the learner when participation is needed. Culture plays an important role in nonverbal communication, and it is one aspect that helps to influence how learning activities are organized. In many Indigenous American Communities, for example, there is often an emphasis on nonverbal communication, which acts as a valued means by which children learn. In a study on Children from both US Mexican (with presumed indigenous backgrounds) and European American heritages who watched a video of children working together without speaking found that the Mexican-heritage children were far more likely to describe the children's actions as collaborative, saying that the children in the video were "talking with their hands and with their eyes."

A key characteristic of this type of nonverbal learning is that children have the opportunity to observe and interact with all parts of an activity. Many Indigenous American children are in close contact with adults and other children who are performing the activities that they will eventually master. Objects and materials become familiar to the child as the activities are a normal part of everyday life. Learning is done in an extremely contextualized environment rather than one specifically tailored to be instructional. For example, the direct involvement that Mazahua children take in the marketplace is used as a type of interactional organization for learning without explicit verbal instruction. Children learn how to run a market stall, take part in caregiving, and also learn other basic responsibilities through non-structured activities, cooperating voluntarily within a motivational context to participate. Not explicitly instructing or guiding the children teaches them how to integrate into small coordinated groups to solve a problem through consensus and shared space. These Mazahua separate-but-together practices have shown that participation in everyday interaction and later learning activities establishes enculturation that is rooted in nonverbal social experience. As the children participate in everyday interactions, they are simultaneously learning the cultural meanings behind these interactions. Children's experience with nonverbally organized social interaction helps constitute the process of enculturation.

In some Indigenous communities of the Americas, children reported one of their main reasons for working in their home was to build unity within the family, the same way they desire to build solidarity within their own communities. Most indigenous children learn the importance of putting in this work in the form of nonverbal communication. Evidence of this can be observed in a case study where children are guided through the task of folding a paper figure by observing the posture and gaze of those who guide them through it. This is projected onto homes and communities, as children wait for certain cues from others to initiative cooperate and collaborate.While nonverbal communication is more prevalent in Indigenous American Communities, verbal communication is also used. Preferably, verbal communication does not substitute one's involvement in an activity, but instead acts as additional guidance or support towards the completion of an activity.

One aspect of nonverbal communication that aids in conveying these precise and symbolic meanings is "context-embeddedness." The idea that many children in Indigenous American Communities are closely involved in community endeavors, both spatially and relationally, which help to promote nonverbal communication. When children are closely related to the context of the endeavor as active participants, coordination is based on a shared reference, which helps to allow, maintain, and promote nonverbal communication. The idea of "context-embeddedness" allows nonverbal communication to be a means of learning within Native American Alaskan Athabaskans and Cherokee communities. By observing various family and community social interactions, social engagement is dominated through nonverbal communication. For example, when children elicit thoughts or words verbally to their elders, they are expected to structure their speech carefully. This demonstrates cultural humility and respect as excessive acts of speech when conversational genre shifts reveal weakness and disrespect. This careful self-censorship exemplifies traditional social interaction of Athapaskin and Cherokee Native Americans who are mostly dependent on nonverbal communication.

Nonverbal cues are used by most children in the Warm Springs Indian Reservation community within the parameters of their academic learning environments. This includes referencing Native American religion through stylized hand gestures in colloquial communication, verbal and nonverbal emotional self-containment, and less movement of the lower face to structure attention on the eyes during face-to-face engagement. Therefore, children's approach to social situations within a reservation classroom, for example, may act as a barrier to a predominantly verbal learning environment. Most Warm Springs children benefit from a learning model that suits a nonverbal communicative structure of collaboration, traditional gesture, observational learning and shared references. Nonverbal communication is a large part of indigenous culture, which represents the way communication styles vary from culture to culture.

=== Disadvantages of purely verbal communication across cultures ===
As much of human communication is nonverbal, learning a language without learning its corresponding pragmatics can lead to miscommunication. "This can lead to intercultural conflict (according to Marianna Pogosyan Ph.D.), misunderstandings and ambiguities in communication, despite language fluency." Nonverbal communication makes the difference between bringing cultures together in understanding one another. It can also push people farther away due to misunderstandings in how different groups see certain nonverbal cues or gestures. From birth, children in various cultures are taught the gestures and cues their culture defines as universal which is not the case for others, but some movements are universal. Evidence suggests that smiling when happy, and frowning in response to something upsetting or bad, are culturally universal.

== Biology and physical appearance ==
"In our study of nonverbal communications, the limbic brain is where the action is...because it is the part of the brain that reacts to the world around us reflexively and instantaneously, in real time, and without thought." Certain physical reactions triggered by the limbic system are biological survival responses, are involuntary, and "honest".Some cues are culturally learned and become habitual, others are hereditary. These nature versus nurture questions are still debated.

Along with gestures, physical traits can also convey certain messages in nonverbal communication, for instance, eye color, hair color and height. Melamed and Bozionelos (1992) studied a sample of managers in the United Kingdom and found that height was a key factor in who was promoted. Height can have benefits and drawbacks too: "While tall people often command more respect than short people, height can also be detrimental to some aspects of one-to-one communication, for instance, where you need to 'talk on the same level' or have an 'eye-to-eye' discussion with another person and do not want to be perceived as too big for your boots."

== Chronemics ==
Chronemics is the way time is used in communication. The amount of time individuals provide to others can communicate various messages about their personal priorities. It can also convey relational power: "When you go to see someone who is in a position of power over you, such as your supervisor, it is not uncommon to be kept waiting. However, you would probably consider it bad form to make a more powerful person wait for you. Indeed, the rule seems to be that the time of powerful people is more valuable than the time of less powerful people."

== Movement and body position ==
=== Kinesics ===
Kinesics is defined as movements, more specifically the study of our movements involving our hands, body, and face. The term was coined by Ray Birdwhistell, who considered the term body language inaccurate and instead opted to explain it as nonverbal behaviors stemming from movements of the body. Research around this behavior provides some examples, such as someone casually smiling and leaning forward, as well as maintaining eye contact to radiate a non-dominating and intimate demeanor. In contrast, someone leaning back, a stoic facial expression, and no to little eye contact could emit an unfriendly and dominating demeanor.

Additional research expresses that eye contact is an important part of nonverbal communication involved in kinesics, as longer and appropriate levels of eye contact give an individual credibility. The opposite is said for those who do not maintain eye contact, as they are more likely to be deemed distrustful. More eye contact was also found to be related to higher levels of likability and believability from those people interacted with. A real-life example of this is through service workers, in a study it was found that those workers who welcomed customers with smiles seemed like warmer individuals than those who did not smile. Customers reported that those without smiles and open body movements, such as waving or handshaking, were lacking warmth and deemed less friendly.

=== Haptics: touching in communication ===
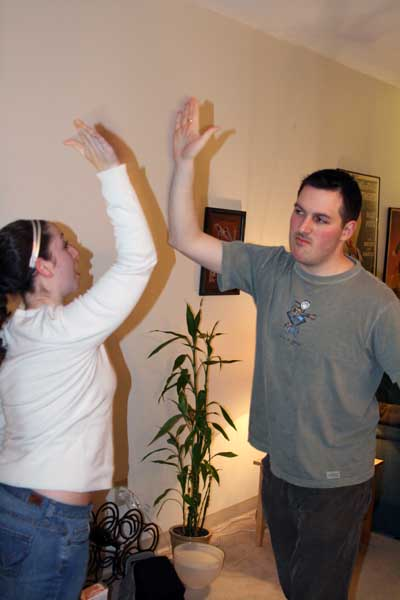
A high five is an example of communicative touch.

Haptics is the study of touching as nonverbal communication, and haptic communication refers to how people and other animals communicate via touching. Touches among humans that can be defined as communication include handshakes, holding hands, kissing (cheek, lips, hand), back slapping, high fives, a pat on the shoulder, and brushing an arm. Touching of oneself may include licking, picking, holding, and scratching. The meaning conveyed from touch is highly dependent upon the culture, the context of the situation, the relationship between communicators, and the manner of touch.

Touch is an extremely important sense for humans; as well as providing information about surfaces and textures it is a component of nonverbal communication in interpersonal relationships, and vital in conveying physical intimacy. Touch is the earliest sense to develop in the fetus. Human babies have been observed to have enormous difficulty surviving if they do not possess a sense of touch, even if they retain sight and hearing.

In chimpanzees, the sense of touch is highly developed. As newborns, they see and hear poorly but cling strongly to their mothers. This allows for even more comparison about nonverbal communication in humans and animals. Harry Harlow conducted a controversial study involving rhesus monkeys and observed that monkeys reared with a "terry cloth mother," a wire feeding apparatus wrapped in soft terry cloth that provided a level of tactile stimulation and comfort, the monkey who had the real parent were considerably more emotionally stable as adults than those with a mere wire mother (Harlow, 1958).

Touching is treated differently from one country to another and socially acceptable levels of touching vary from one culture to another (Remland, 2009). In Thai culture, for example, touching someone's head may be thought rude. Remland and Jones (1995) studied groups of people communicating and found that touching was rare among the English (8%), the French (5%) and the Dutch (4%) compared to Italians (14%) and Greeks (12.5%). Striking, pushing, pulling, pinching, kicking, strangling and hand-to-hand fighting are forms of touch in the context of physical abuse. In the Journal of Nonverbal Behavior, McDaniel et al. assessed touch as a form of communication among people from different nations under the lens of culture, relationships, and a number of body areas touched. Latin Americans are known to have a high degree of tactile activity in contrast to Asians who are considered a no-contact culture as they often steer away from public display of affection (PDA).

=== Proxemics ===
Proxemics is the use of space as a form of communication, and includes how far or near participants position themselves from each other. It can be influenced by culture, race/ethnicity, gender, and age. Edward T. Hall invented the term when he realized that culture influences how people use space in communication while working with diplomats, and published his findings on proxemics in 1959 as The Silent Language. Proxemics also play a big role in business as research shows that gender and invasion of customers' privacy without previous ties negatively affect the outcome of deals. Hall concluded that proxemics could cause misunderstandings between cultures as cultures use of proxemics varies and what is customary in one culture may range from being confusing to being offensive to members of a different culture. People use their space differently because of the meaning behind it as in a spectrum of cultures, ideologies differ. Within American culture, Hall defines four primary distance zones: (i) intimate (touching to eighteen inches) distance, (ii) personal (eighteen inches to four feet) distance, (iii) social (four to twelve feet) distance, and (iv) public (more than twelve feet) distance.

According to Hall, the amount of space we maintain between ourselves and the persons we communicate with shows the importance of the science of proxemics. In this process, it is seen how we feel towards others at that particular time. This resonates with proxemics and viewing it through the cultural lens.

Intimate space is any distance less than 18 inches, and is most commonly used by individuals when they are engaging with someone with whom they feel very comfortable, such as a spouse, partner, friend, child, or parent. Personal space is a distance of 18 inches to 4 feet and is usually used when individuals are interacting with friends. Social distance is the most common type of proximity as it is used when communicating with colleagues, classmates, acquaintances, or strangers. Public distance creates the greatest gap between the individual and the audience and is categorized as distances greater than 12 feet in distance and is often used for speeches, lectures, or formal occasions.

== In relation to verbal communication ==
Differentiating which parts of a face-to-face conversation are communicated verbally versus non-verbally is not straightforward. Other studies done on the same subject have concluded that in more relaxed and natural settings of communication, verbal and non-verbal signals and cues can contribute in surprisingly similar ways.

Argyle, using video tapes shown to the subjects, analysed the communication of submissive/dominant attitude, (high and low context, high context resorting to more strict social classes and take a more short and quick response route to portray dominance, low context being the opposite by taking time to explain everything and putting a lot of importance on communication and building trust and respect with others in a submissive and relaxed manner), and found that non-verbal cues had 4.3 times the effect of verbal cues. The most important effect was that body posture communicated superior status (specific to culture and context said person grew up in) in a very efficient way.

On the other hand, a study by Hsee et al. had subjects judge a person on the happy/sad dimension and found that words spoken with minimal variation in intonation had an impact about 4 times larger than face expressions seen in a film without sound. Therefore, when considering certain non-verbal mannerisms such as facial expressions and physical cues, they can conflict in meaning when compared to spoken language and emotions. Different setups and scenarios would yield different responses and meanings when using both types of communication. In other ways they can complement each other, provided they are used together wisely during a conversation.

This relationship between verbal and nonverbal cues has become prominent in digital learning environments. A study done by Schneider and Krieglstein (2022) concluded that the emphasis on facial expressions and gestures, and improved the student's quality of learning. Participants who viewed lectures with a gesturing agent showed improved retention and transfer scores relative to those who did not. The study found that students exposed to lectures incorporating gestures demonstrated higher comprehension and improved learning outcomes. These findings illustrate how nonverbal behaviors can influence the effectiveness of communication, which connects to broader strategies for improving nonverbal awareness.

=== Interaction ===
During communication, nonverbal messages can interact with verbal messages in six ways: repeating, conflicting, complementing, substituting, regulating and accenting/moderating.

==== Conflicting ====
Conflicting verbal and nonverbal messages within the same interaction can sometimes send opposing or conflicting messages. A person verbally expressing a statement of truth while simultaneously fidgeting or avoiding eye contact may convey a mixed message to the receiver in the interaction. When mixed messages occur, nonverbal communication becomes the primary tool people use to attain additional information to clarify the situation; great attention is placed on bodily movements and positioning when people perceive mixed messages during interactions. There are different dimensions of verbal and nonverbal communication that have been discovered, such as structure versus non-structure, linguistic versus non-linguistic, continuous versus discontinuous, learned versus innate, and left versus right hemispheric processing.

==== Complementing ====
Accurate interpretation of messages is made easier when nonverbal and verbal communication complement each other. Nonverbal cues can be used to elaborate on verbal messages to reinforce the information sent when trying to achieve communicative goals. Messages have been shown to be remembered better when nonverbal signals affirm the verbal exchange.

==== Substituting ====
Nonverbal behavior is sometimes used as the sole channel for communication of a message. People learn to identify facial expressions, body movements, and body positioning as corresponding with specific feelings and intentions. These gestures and expressions are, at times, all that is needed to convey a certain message. Nonverbal signals can be used without verbal communication to convey messages; when nonverbal behavior does not effectively communicate a message, verbal methods are used to enhance understanding.

==== Structure versus non-structure ====
Verbal communication is a highly structured form of communication with set rules of grammar. The rules of verbal communication help to understand and make sense of what other people are saying. For example, foreigners learning a new language can have a hard time making themselves understood. On the other hand, nonverbal communication has no formal structure when it comes to communicating. Nonverbal communication can occur without even having a conscious thought about it. The same behavior can mean different things, such as crying of sadness or of joy. Therefore, these cues need to be interpreted carefully to get their correct meaning.

==== Linguistic versus non-linguistic ====
There are only a few assigned symbols in the system of nonverbal communication. Nodding the head is one symbol that indicates agreement in some cultures, but in others, it means disagreement. On the other hand, verbal communication has a system of symbols that have specific meanings to them.

==== Continuous and discontinuous ====
Verbal communication is based on discontinuous units whereas nonverbal communication is continuous. Communicating nonverbally cannot be stopped unless one would leave the room, but even then, the intrapersonal processes still take place. Without the presence of someone else, the body still manages to undergo nonverbal communication. For example, there are no other words being spoken after a heated debate, but there are still angry faces and cold stares being distributed. People can control verbal communication much easier by wathing what they say, but it is much more difficult to keep from making subconscious gestures and expressions. This is an example of how nonverbal communication is continuous.

==== Learned versus innate ====
Learned non-verbal cues require a community or culture for their reinforcement. For example, table manners are not innate capabilities upon birth. Dress code is a non-verbal cue that must be established by society. Hand symbols, whose interpretation can vary from culture to culture, are not innate nonverbal cues. Learned cues must be gradually reinforced by admonition or positive feedback.

Innate non-verbal cues are "built-in" features of human behavior. Generally, these innate cues are universally prevalent and regardless of culture. For example, smiling, crying, and laughing do not require teaching. Similarly, some body positions, such as the fetal position, are universally associated with weakness.

Communicating cues are much more complex than one would think, therefore it is important to distinguish which cues are cultural and which are universal. Due to their universality, the ability to comprehend these cues is not limited to individual cultures.

==== Left versus right-hemispheric processing ====
This type of processing involves the neurophysiological approach to nonverbal communication. It explains that the right hemisphere processes nonverbal stimuli such as those involving spatial, pictorial, and gestalt tasks while the left hemisphere involves the verbal stimuli involving analytical and reasoning tasks. It is possible that individuals may not use the correct hemisphere at appropriate times when it comes to interpreting a message or meaning. This can lead to miscommunication and misunderstandings.

== Clinical studies ==
=== Principles ===
From 1977 to 2004, the influence of disease and drugs on receptivity of nonverbal communication was studied by teams at three separate medical schools using a similar paradigm. Researchers at the University of Pittsburgh, Yale University and Ohio State University had subjects observe gamblers at a slot machine awaiting payoffs. The amount of this payoff was read by nonverbal transmission prior to reinforcement. This technique was developed by and the studies directed by psychologist Robert E. Miller and psychiatrist A. James Giannini. These groups reported diminished receptive ability in heroin addicts and phencyclidine abusers, contrasted with increased receptivity in cocaine addicts. Men with major depression manifested significantly decreased ability to read nonverbal cues when compared with euthymic men. In some subjects tested for ability to read nonverbal cues, intuitive paradigms were apparently employed while in others a cause and effect approach was used. Subjects in the former group answered quickly and before reinforcement occurred. Subjects in the latter category delayed their response and could offer reasons for their choice. The level of accuracy between the two groups did not vary nor did handedness.

Obese women and women with premenstrual syndrome were found to also possess diminished abilities to read these cues. In contradistinction, men with bipolar disorder possessed increased abilities. A woman with total paralysis of the nerves of facial expression was found unable to transmit or receive any nonverbal facial cues whatsoever. Because of the changes in levels of accuracy on the levels of nonverbal receptivity, the members of the research team hypothesized a level of involvement of neurotransmitters when interpreting nonverbal cues. Users of certain drugs had an enhanced ability while users of other drugs had a diminished ability. Based on the available data, however, the primary cause and primary effect could not be sorted out on the basis of the paradigm employed. The authors also hypothesised that it is possible that, for example, cocaine abusers do so because their pre-existing abilities helped them to conceal their drug abuse.

=== Child comprehension ===
An increased emphasis on gestures exists when intonations or facial expression are used. "Speakers often anticipate how recipients will interpret their utterances. If they wish some other, less obvious interpretation, they may "mark" their utterance (e.g. with special intonations or facial expressions)." This specific emphasis known as 'marking' can be spotted as a learned form of non-verbal communication in toddlers.

A groundbreaking study from Carpenter et al. in the Journal of Child Language has concluded that the act of marking a gesture is recognized by three-year-olds but not by two-year-olds.In the study, two and three-year-old toddlers were tested on their recognition of markedness within gestures. The experiment was conducted in a room with an examiner and the test subjects, which for the first study were three-year-olds. The examiner sat across from each child individually, and allowed them to play with various objects including a purse with a sponge in it and a box with a sponge in it. After allowing the child to play with the objects for three minutes, the examiner told the child it was time to clean up and motioned by pointing to the objects. They measured the responses of the children by first pointing and not marking the gesture, to see the child's reaction to the request and if they reached for the objects to clean them up. After observing the child's response, the examiner then asked and pointed again, marking the gesture with facial expression. The results showed that three-year-old children were able to recognize the markedness, by responding to the gesture and cleaning the objects up as opposed to when the gesture was presented without being marked.

In the second study in which the same experiment was performed on two-year-olds, the results were different. For the most part, the children did not recognize the difference between the marked and unmarked gesture by not responding more prevalently to the marked gesture. This shows that this sort of nonverbal communication is learned at a young age, but is better recognized in three-year-old children than two-year-old children, making it easier for us to interpret that the ability to recognize markedness is learned in the early stages of development, but not too early. For most it is somewhere between three and four years of age.

Boone and Cunningham conducted a study to determine at which age children begin to recognize emotional meaning (happiness, sadness, anger and fear) in expressive body movements. The study included 29 adults and 79 children divided into age groups of four-, five- and eight-year-olds. The children were shown two clips simultaneously and were asked to point to the one that was expressing the target emotion. The results of the study revealed that of the four emotions being tested the 4-year-olds were only able to correctly identify sadness at a rate that was better than chance. The 5-year-olds performed better and were able to identify happiness, sadness and fear at better than chance levels. The 8-year-olds and adults could correctly identify all four emotions and there was very little difference between the scores of the two groups. Between the ages of 4 and 8, nonverbal communication and decoding skills improve dramatically.

A study was conducted to determine how nonverbal communication and play amongst children, particularly autistic children, affects language development. Mundy et al. observed communication amongst groups of autistic children divided by diagnosed mental age from a sample of 16 children. The study had observations of how the children played between each other using an assortment of items provided, such as a spoon, doll, toy car, toy telephone, sponge, and more. Play development was measured using a checklist of observed "functional acts", or using the toys for functional purposes like pushing a toy car, brushing hair, or feeding a doll with a spoon, and "symbolic acts", or using objects and toys for different purposes aside from their expressed usage, such as using a sponge as play food or using a doll to "drive" the toy car. Language development was measured using the Reynell Developmental Language Scales to measure the extent of how the children interact between "social partners", or members of the same studied play group, and the advancement of responding to interaction, initiating interaction, responding to attention being pointed to another object, initiating attention towards another object, responding to behavior regulation, and initiating behavior regulation. The study concluded that there was little to no correlation between play and nonverbal communication, concluding in possible further psychological factors such as metacognitive awareness of pretending or delayed imitation within play being possible explanations for play development. Little significance with the results of language acquisition was found, opening up discussion and further research due to outliers within the results.

Research indicates that emotional expressions differ across various positives, describing that emotions can be communicated vocally or expressively on someone's face. Regardless of whether emotions are expressed vocally or perceived nonverbally, they can appear in many different contexts, in which they are utilized to communicate more efficiently. For instance, in a healthcare setting, nurses rely on nonverbal behaviors in the case of hearing loss with a patient. A study conducted by Wanko Keutchafo concluded that effective nurse nonverbal communication with hospitalized older adults, is shaped by the nurse's own intrinsic factors, including their attitudes and beliefs towards the patients. The professional employs smiles and gentle eye contact to communicate safety and respect towards the older adults, as these patients rely more on visual cues. Along with facial movement, they also use touch, such as gently placing a hand on a patients shoulder in attempt at reassurance. Wanko Keutchafo EL, Kerr J, Baloyi OB, Duma SE. (2022) "Conditions Influencing Effective Nurse Nonverbal Communication With Hospitalized Older Adults in Cameroon". Global Qualitative Nursing Research. The use of space was also considered when dealing with slow approaches or sitting on a bed, in which some nurses refrained from this method due to a patient's cultural beliefs, which resulted in reduced communication.

As for other interactions, such as students in a classroom setting, teachers may take advantage of indicating gestures, like pointing, to direct the children's attention and highlight any mishaps. As introduced in the study "Nonverbal Communication in Classroom Interaction and Its Role in Italian Foreign Language Teaching and Learning" by Pierangela Diadori, these methods can be seen as pointing to one's feet, in representation of the meaning "today/now". Another is drawing a circle with their arms, to portray "working around an idea". The study found that nonverbal behaviors play a central role in Italian foreign-language classrooms, functioning as a tool for both learning and teaching. Nonverbal communication cues are integrated into the instructor's practices to support comprehension and classroom management.

=== Comprehension of nonverbal facial cues ===
A byproduct of the work of the Pittsburgh/Yale/Ohio State team was an investigation of the role of nonverbal facial cues in heterosexual nondate rape. Males who were serial rapists of adult women were studied for nonverbal receptive abilities. Their scores were the highest of any subgroup. Rape victims were next tested. It was reported that women who had been raped on at least two occasions by different perpetrators had a highly significant impairment in their abilities to read these cues in either male or female senders. These results were troubling, indicating a predator-prey model. The authors did note that whatever the nature of these preliminary findings the responsibility of the rapist was in no manner or level diminished.The final target of study for this group was the medical students they taught. Medical students at Ohio State University, Ohio University and Northeast Ohio Medical College were invited to serve as subjects. Students indicating a preference for the specialties of family practice, psychiatry, pediatrics and obstetrics-gynecology achieved significantly higher levels of accuracy than those students who planned to train as surgeons, radiologists, or pathologists. Internal medicine and plastic surgery candidates scored at levels near the mean.

== See also ==
Theories and fields of study

- Animal communication
- Behavioral communication
- Doctrine of mental reservation
- Regulatory focus theory
- Semiotics
- Unconscious communication

Specific kinds of nonverbal cues

- Chinese number gestures
- Microexpression
- Silent service code

Notable people

- Albert Mehrabian
- Desmond Morris
- Joe Navarro

Communication skills or deficiencies

- People skills
- Dyssemia
- Forgetfulness
- Intercultural competence
- Nonverbal autism
- Nunchi

Other

- Asemic writing
- Augmentative and alternative communication
- Ishin-denshin
- Meta-communication
- Neuro-linguistic programming
- Nonverbal influence
- Statement analysis
- Subtext
- Twilight language
- Unsaid

== Bibliography ==
- Andersen P (2007). Nonverbal Communication: Forms and Functions (2nd ed.). Waveland Press.
- Andersen P (2004). The Complete Idiot's Guide to Body Language. Alpha Publishing. ISBN 978-1-59257-248-9.
- Argyle M (1988). Bodily Communication (2nd ed.). Madison: International Universities Press. ISBN 978-0-416-38140-5.
- Brehove A (2011). Knack Body Language: Techniques on Interpreting Nonverbal Cues in the World and Workplace. Guilford, CT: Globe Pequot Press. ISBN 978-1-59921-949-3. Archived from the original on 24 September 2015.
- Bridges J (1998). How to be a Gentleman (PDF). Nashville, TN: Rutledge Hill Press. Archived from the original (PDF) on 16 June 2015.
- Bull PE (1987). Posture and Gesture. Oxford: Pergamon Press. ISBN 978-0-08-031332-0.
- Burgoon JK, Guerrero LK, Floyd K (2011). Nonverbal communication. Boston: Allyn & Bacon. ISBN 978-0-205-52500-3.
- Campbell S (2005). Saying What's Real. Tiburon, CA: Publishers Group West. ISBN 978-1-932073-12-6.
- Driver J (2010). You Say More Than You Think. New York, NY: Crown Publishers. ISBN 978-0-307-45397-6.
- Ekman P (2003). Emotions Revealed. New York, NY: Owl Books. ISBN 978-0-8050-7275-4.
- Floyd K, Guerrero LK (2006). Nonverbal communication in close relationships. Mahwah, New Jersey: Lawrence Erlbaum Associates. ISBN 978-0-8058-4397-2.
- Gilbert M (2002). Communication Miracles at Work. Berkeley, CA: Publishers Group West. ISBN 978-1-57324-802-0.
- Givens DB (2000). "Body speak: what are you saying?". Successful Meetings (October) 51.
- Givens D (2005). Love Signals. New York, NY: St. Martins Press. ISBN 978-0-312-31505-4.
- Guerrero LK, DeVito JA, Hecht ML, eds. (1999). The nonverbal communication reader (2nd ed.). Lone Grove, Illinois: Waveland Press. Archived from the original on 5 July 2007.
- Gudykunst WB, Ting-Toomey S (1988). Culture and Interpersonal Communication. California: Sage Publications Inc.
- Hanna JL (1987). To Dance Is Human: A Theory of Nonverbal Communication. Chicago: University of Chicago Press.
- Hargie O, Dickson D (2004). Skilled Interpersonal Communication: Research, Theory and Practice. Hove: Routledge. ISBN 978-0-415-22719-3.
- Knapp ML, Hall JA (2007). Nonverbal Communication in Human Interaction (5th ed.). Wadsworth: Thomas Learning. ISBN 978-0-15-506372-3.
- Melamed J, Bozionelos N (1992). "Managerial promotion and height". Psychological Reports. 71 (6): 587–593. doi:10.2466/pr0.1992.71.2.587.
- Ottenheimer HJ (2007). The anthropology of language: an introduction to linguistic anthropology. Kansas State: Thomson Wadsworth.
- Pease B, Pease A (2004). The Definitive Book of Body Language. New York, NY: Bantam Books.
- Remland MS (2009). Nonverbal communication in everyday life. Boston: Allyn & Bacon.
- Segerstrale U, Molnar P, eds. (1997). Nonverbal Communication: Where Nature Meets Culture. Mahwah, NJ: Lawrence Erlbaum Associates. ISBN 978-0-8058-2179-6.
- Simpson-Giles C (2001). How to Be a Lady. Nashville, TN: Rutledge Hill Press. ISBN 978-1-55853-939-6.
- Zysk W (2004). Körpersprache – Eine neue Sicht (Doctoral Dissertation 2004) (in German). University Duisburg-Essen (Germany).
