= Haragei =

Japanese concept of interpersonal communication

Haragei (腹芸, はらげい) is a Japanese concept of interpersonal communication. It also appears in martial arts circles, with a somewhat different meaning: see below. Literally translated, the term means "stomach art", and it refers to an exchange of thoughts and feelings that is implied in conversation, rather than explicitly stated. It is a form of rhetoric intended to express real intention and true meaning through implication. In some societies, it can also denote charisma or strength of personality.

Takie Lebra identified four dimensions of Japanese silence – truthfulness, social discretion, embarrassment and defiance. In Western literature, the essence of the difference between just talking and really communicating through silence is analyzed in Harold Pinter's The Dumb Waiter.

In negotiation, haragei is characterised by euphemisms, vague and indirect statements, prolonged silences and careful avoidance of any comment that might cause offense. Information is communicated through timing, facial expression and emotional context, rather than through direct speech. It is sometimes considered a duplicitous tactic in negotiation to obfuscate one's true intentions, which may cause haragei to be viewed with suspicion. It can also be misconstrued by those with limited experience in the tactic.

Haragei also functions as a method of leadership, replacing direct orders to subordinates with subtle, non-verbal signals. It is considered a desirable trait in a leader in Japan. However, it may make assigning of responsibility or blame to the leader difficult.

== In martial arts ==
In martial arts circles, haragei has a different meaning, although the concepts are related. Here it refers to those arts which enable the practitioner to sense threats or anticipate an opponent's movements.

== See also ==
- High- and low-context cultures
- Implicature
- Ishin-denshin
- Nunchi
