= Henry H. Calero =

Communication expert

- Occupation: Author
- Notable work: The Power of Nonverbal Communication, How to Read a Person Like a Book

Henry H. Calero was an author and consultant who specialized in the field of communication and negotiation for over three decades. He is most recognized for his book The Power of Nonverbal Communication: How You Act Is More Important Than What You Say which was published in 2005. In addition to this work, Calero also collaborated with Gerard I. Nierenberg on several books, including How to Read a Person Like a Book which was first published in 1971, and The New Art of Negotiating which was released in 2008.

== Books ==
Calero's work emphasized the significance of nonverbal communication and body language in comprehending and interpreting the thoughts and intentions of others. Calero is the author of several books, including:

- How to Read a Person Like a Book (with Gerard Nierenberg)
- The New Art of Negotiating—Updated Edition: How to Close Any Deal (with Gerard Nierenberg)
- Cómo leer a una persona como un libro (with Gerard Nierenberg and Gabriel Grayson)
- Meta-Talk: The Guide to Hidden Meanings in Conversations (with Gerard Nierenberg)
- The Power of Nonverbal Communication: How You Act Is More Important Than What You Say
