= Unconscious =

Unconscious may refer to:

== Physiology ==
- Unconsciousness, the lack of consciousness or responsiveness to people and other environmental stimuli

== Psychology ==
- Unconscious mind, the mind operating well outside the attention of the conscious mind as defined by Sigmund Freud and others
- Unconscious, an altered state of consciousness with limited conscious awareness
- Not conscious

== Philosophy, spirituality ==
- Unconscious spirit, the supposed part of the human spirit or soul operating outside of conscious awareness

== Media ==
- Unconscious (2014), UK release title of Amnesiac, an American mystery film

== See also ==
- Inconscientes
- Consciousness
- Unconscious communication
- Subconscious
- Carl Jung's concept of collective unconscious
- Unconscious cognition
- Subliminal stimuli
- Priming (psychology)
