= Clara Mayo =

Social psychologist

- Born: Clara Alexandra Weiss; September 13, 1931; Linz, Austria
- Died: November 21, 1981 (aged 50)
- Occupation: Social psychologist

Academic background
- Education: Cornell University; Wellesley College; Clark University (PhD)
- Thesis: Cognitive complexity and conflict resolution in impression formation (1959)

Academic work
- Discipline: Psychologist
- Sub-discipline: Social psychology

Clara Alexandra Weiss (Mayo) (1931–1981) was a social psychologist who conducted research into the processes of social perception and nonverbal communication with the primary purpose of understanding prejudice and stereotyping. Her research shifted the focus from individual behaviors to nonverbal behaviors.

== Early life and education ==
Clara Alexandra Weiss was born in Linz, Austria, on September 13, 1931 as the only child to Joseph, a product of “mixed marriage” and Maria Weiss, a Catholic. Weiss early childhood was peaceful until Hitler took charge and her family had to leave their life of luxury in an attempt to avoid getting captured by the Nazis. The Weiss family managed to land in southern France undetected but then became refugees attempting to enter into the United States. Upon their arrival to the United States, Clara Weiss learned English by reading from the children’s books from the Children’s Room of the New York Public Library from A to Z. English became Weiss’ third language, the others being German and French.

After graduating from Hunter High School, Clara Weiss enrolled in Cornell University in Ithaca, New York, where she majored in philosophy and was introduced to psychology by Urie Bronfenbrenner. Some of the research that she conducted was focused on the capacity to detect small behavioral cues. After conducting this study she came to the conclusion that women are good readers of nonverbal cues. She graduated with honors bachelor's degree in philosophy in 1953. Earlier that year she married James P. Mayo, Jr. In 1955 she received a master's degree from Wellesley College in Wellesley, Massachusetts. She was then accepted into the social psychology doctoral program at Clark University in Worcester, Massachusetts. Mayo received her Ph.D. from Clark in 1959. After leaving Clark, she worked as a social psychology trainee at the Veterans Administration Hospital in Brockton, Massachusetts.

== Contributions and achievements ==
Clara Alexandra Weiss “strongly believed in the potential of applied social psychology to redress social problems". She was involved in one of the first studies that look at the effect of racial integration in school busing. This study wanted to know why black parents were paying to bus their children to predominantly white Boston schools. She also conducted research on black and white nonverbal differences in conversational interactions. Mayo turned her research into two books Moving Bodies: Nonverbal Communication in Social Relationships; coauthor was LaFrance and Gender and Nonverbal Behaviors.
