= Silent service code =

Method of communication between diner and waitstaff

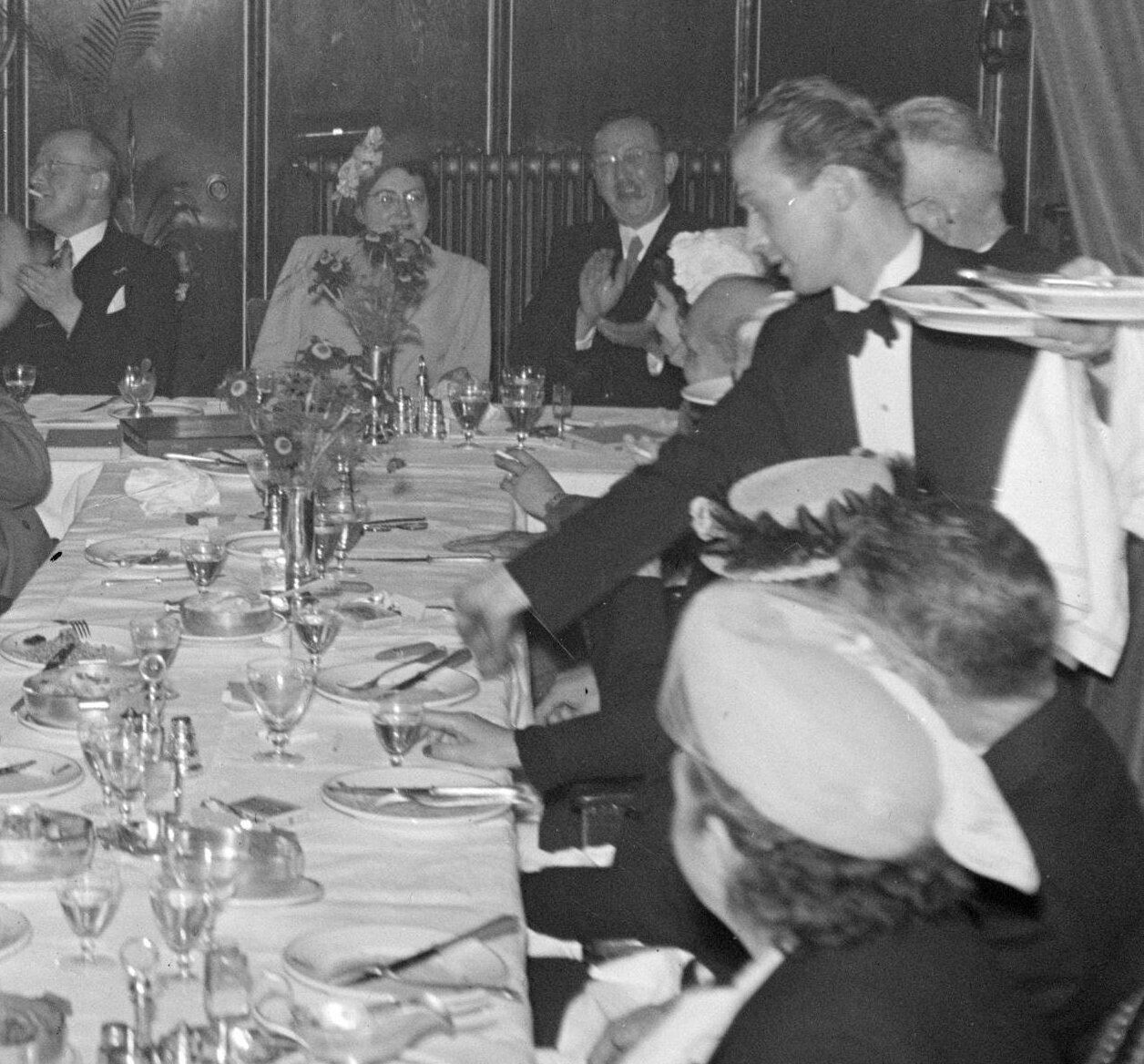
Dinner with various cutlery positions, waiter taking empty plates (1950)

In the United States, the silent service code is a way for a diner to communicate to waitstaff during a meal to indicate whether the diner is finished with their plate. This is intended to prevent situations where the server might remove a plate of food and utensils prematurely.

The code is almost always taught during business dining etiquette classes.

== Signals ==
To indicate they have finished with their plate, a diner places their napkin to the left of their plate and places their utensils together at the "4-o'clock" position on their plate. It is applicable to most types of table service: without waitstaff, the host or hosts may find it informative in judging when to clear away a course or the meal.

Utensils crossed on a plate signify that a diner is still eating. If a diner must leave during a course, placing their napkin on their chair indicates they are not finished.

== See also ==
- Eating utensil etiquette
- Nonverbal communication
