= Dyssemia =

Difficulties with nonverbal communication

Dyssemia is a difficulty with receptive and/or expressive nonverbal communication. The word comes from the Greek roots dys (difficulty) and semia (signal). The term was coined by psychologists Marshall Duke and Stephen Nowicki in their 1992 book, Helping The Child Who Doesn't Fit In, to decipher the hidden dimensions of social rejection. These difficulties go beyond problems with body language and motor skills. Dyssemic persons exhibit difficulties with the acquisition and use of nonverbal cues in interpersonal relationships. "A classic set of studies by Albert Mehrabian showed that in face-to-face interactions, 55 percent of the emotional meaning of a message is expressed through facial, postural, and gestural means, and 38 percent of the emotional meaning is transmitted through the tone of voice. Only seven percent of the emotional meaning is actually expressed with words." Dyssemia represents the social dysfunction aspect of nonverbal learning disorder.

== Dyssemic adults ==
The social interactions of dyssemic adults tend to be immature and complex, even though their non-relational reasoning ranges from normal to gifted. Dyssemic individuals exhibit varying degrees of social awkwardness and various types of nonverbal communication difficulties. Some might only have trouble with reception or expression alone, while others struggle with both. Severity fluctuates among individuals; difficulty does not necessarily equate to total inability, nor occur in all situations. Occasionally, expressive difficulty may only be a delay between the emotion and the facial muscles. Socially awkward adults with nonverbal shortcomings often report feeling "a little out of it socially" or feeling "left out."

Dyssemic adults frequently experience success in temporary or accidental situations, but their sense of success can be short-lived, returning to an often common pattern of disappointment and self-reproach. Many times dyssemic individuals may say something in a way they had not intended and worry about the consequences. Dyssemic adults may sometimes struggle with interpreting the feelings or social interests of new acquaintances, causing potential resentment and/or rejection. They also may have difficulty with subtler aspects of social interaction, for example, timing and opportunity. This may aggravate the situation, baffling acquaintances, coworkers, and even relatives. Dyssemic individuals may also become targets of adult bullies. If dyssemic adults are in an environment or situation with adequate verbal input or other cues, however, they have a frame for understanding or constructing appropriate responses, and these problems can be greatly reduced.

There is presently little research on adults with dyssemia/NLD compared to the research on children, making it difficult to treat medically. Until more adults are included in the research on diagnosis and treatment, misperceptions may occur and their quality of life may deteriorate over time into loneliness, isolation, anger, and even aggression as a result of a lack of understanding on the part of both populations. However, it may be treated socially to some extent. Through intense observation or asking questions, as of a supportive friend or colleague, the individual with dyssemia can often eventually "pass" in most situations once he or she has learned the typical gestures for a given situation. Since many adults with dyssemia or NLD are quite competent in reading or writing, it is often helpful to clarify one's communication using fully worded sentences, or supplementing gestures or facial expressions with a verbal clue as to meaning. Social anxiety or social phobia are medical classifications that can be used to designate nonverbal communication problems; however, dyssemia is not an anxiety or phobia when it applies to NLD or specific brain damage, for example to the right hemisphere. Chronic dyssemia is a condition that some neurologists term social-emotional processing disorder (SEPD).

== A difference rather than a disability ==
Dyssemia is considered a difference rather than a disability; as such, it is not classified as a standard medical condition. Many times dyssemia springs from cultural differences; other times, dyssemia constitutes an offshoot of attention deficit disorder (ADD). However, the differences can be devastating. Problems associated with dyssemia in the establishment and maintenance of interpersonal relationships are often at the root of people's social and occupational troubles. Sometimes, persons affected with mild autism spectrum disorder (ASD) or social anxiety disorder also struggle with characteristics of dyssemia. Dyssemia can be remediated through a variety of programs designed to assess its presence and alter its adverse impact. Such programs, not unlike acculturation, emphasize virtual and social learning.

== See also ==
- Asperger syndrome
- Autism spectrum disorder
- Body language
- Developmental coordination disorder
- Emotional intelligence (EQ)
- Friendship
- Nonverbal learning disorder
- Observational learning
- Rejection
- Self-efficacy
- Social behavior
- Social learning theory
- Social learning (social pedagogy)
- Social pedagogy
