= Unsaid =

Term referring to a social behaviour

The term "unsaid" refers what is not explicitly stated, what is hidden and/or implied in the speech of an individual or a group of people.

The unsaid may be the product of intimidation; of a mulling over of thought; or of bafflement in the face of the inexpressible.

== Linguistics ==
Sociolinguistics points out that in normal communication what is left unsaid is as important as what is actually said—that we expect our auditors regularly to fill in the social context/norms of our conversations as we proceed.

Basil Bernstein saw one difference between the restricted code and the elaborated code of speech is that more would be left implicit in the former than the latter.

== Ethnology ==
In ethnology, ethnomethodology established a strong link between unsaid and axiomatic. Harold Garfinkel, following Durkheim, stressed that in any given situation, even a legally binding contract, the terms of agreement rest upon the 90% of unspoken assumptions that underlie the visible (spoken) tip of the interactive iceberg.

Edward T. Hall argued that much cross-cultural miscommunication stemmed from neglect of the silent, unspoken, but differing cultural patterns that each participant unconsciously took for granted.

== Psychoanalysis ==
Luce Irigaray has emphasised the importance of listening to the unsaid dimension of discourse in psychoanalytic practice—something which may shed light on the unconscious phantasies of the person being analysed.

Other psychotherapies have also emphasised the importance of the non-verbal component of the patient's communication, sometimes privileging this over the verbal content. Behind all such thinking stands Freud's dictum: "no mortal can keep a secret. If his lips are silent, he chatters with his fingertips...at every pore".

== Cultural examples ==
- Sherlock Holmes is said to have owed his success to his attention to the unsaid in his client's communications.
- In Small World, the heroine cheekily excuses her lack of note-taking to a Sorbonne professor by saying: "it is not what you say that impresses me most, it is what you are silent about: ideas, morality, love, death, things...Vos silences profonds".

== See also ==
- Don't ask, don't tell
- Elephant in the room
- Innuendo
- Negative capability
- Praeteritio
- Proxemics
- Spiral of silence
- Subtext
- Tacit knowledge
- Unconscious communication
