= Nonverbal influence =

Influencing others via tone or body language

Nonverbal influence is the act of affecting or inspiring change in others' behaviors and attitudes through tone of voice or body language and other nonverbal cues like facial expression. This act of getting others to embrace or resist new attitudes can be achieved with or without the use of spoken language. Many individuals instinctively associate persuasion with verbal messages. Nonverbal influence emphasizes the persuasive power and influence of nonverbal communication. Nonverbal influence includes appeals to attraction, similarity and intimacy.

Nonverbal influence also speaks to social influence. Normal social influence research focuses on words or linguistic choices and scripts in order to effect a certain level of influence on a communication receiver or individual when in engaging in the act of inspiring change in a behavior or preconceived attitude. This focus on the verbal messaging without including the nonverbal aspects has also resulted in a lack of empirical data on the relationship between nonverbal communication and influence strategies.

== Attraction ==
Attraction, which refers to interpersonal attraction, is a positive attitude that corresponds with a likelihood to respond to another in a positive manner. Carl Hovland argued that one of the three main classes of stimuli that determines the success of persuasive attempts is the observable characteristics of the source of the message. Messages that originate from a physically attractive person are agreed upon by scholars to be more persuasive than messages coming from average looking or unattractive sources. An appeal to attraction can occur in advance of any verbal message. The level of persuasion via attractiveness can vary from one audience to another significantly. The persuasive power of attractiveness can even be counterintuitive. Attractiveness can be more persuasive than argument quality or trustworthiness. The thinking that the best type of argument is the most logical one is not necessarily true a conflicting argument is coming from a highly attractive source.

This congruity between attraction and influence can be seen in the interactions between two people engaging in flirtation or dating. Dr. Jeremy Nicholson wrote an article for Psychology Today titled "Persuasive Body Language for Flirting and Dating". Nicholson references Fennis and Stel(2011) and their research on the proper pairing of nonverbal communication with varying influence strategies. In their experiments they found that coupling certain nonverbal communication with certain strategies would garner a higher level of success in effecting change provided they are coupled correctly.

As Nicholson states about Fennis and Stel's research, "Essentially they note, when trying to persuade someone with a cautious "prevention focus", it is better to use a vigilant nonverbal style. In contrast, persuasion with an open "promotion focus", requires an eager nonverbal style." When a relationship is new a communication recipient will have more of a prevention focus and so body language will exhibit and effort to keep distance. When the two people are more relaxed as they get more acquainted, the focus then shifts from prevention to promotion, and the body language as well as other nonverbal cues will change in order to match that focus.

== Similarity ==
Similarity refers to the sharing of attitudes, backgrounds, values, knowledge and communication styles in common. Nonverbal behaviors are the means by which people infer similarity to a source's inner feelings or beliefs when they are not stated explicitly. Theories of attraction and similarity typically invoke each other because the nonverbal cues that promote or signify both concepts greatly influence each other. If the source of a message is attractive then one may attempt to find similarities between the source and themselves. If the source of a message displays nonverbal cues that cause receivers to infer that they share similar attitudes or beliefs then they will view the source as more attractive because they are more like them. It is debatable to what degree attraction or similarity can be stimulated via calculated nonverbal cues and how effective the persuasion will be in producing the desired behavior.

== Intimacy ==
In terms of nonverbal influence and persuasion, intimacy refers to the receiver's intrinsic motivation to create a strong bond through a close interpersonal relationship. Intimacy can also be viewed from the source's perspective. The source can view persuasive message delivery as those which the receiver can connect to on a personal level. It may be more difficult to nonverbally influence a large and diverse group through the use of intimacy in a message than a small homogeneous group.

== Non-verbal expressions of power, dominance, and status ==
The major avenue for the communication of power, dominance, status. There are several avenues that display non-verbal behavior. These non-verbal expressions are conveyed through kinesics, proxemics, physical appearance and artifacts, and chronemics.

- Kinesics is a complex method in communicating dominance and status through eye contact. Staring is used to connote dominance, while averting gaze is likely to communicate submission.
- Proxemics is the study of measurable distances between people as they interact with one another. The distance between people in a social situation often discloses information about the type of relationship between the people involved.
- Proximity may also reveal the type of social setting taking place.

1. Intimate distance ranges from touching to about 18 inches (46 cm) apart, and is reserved for lovers, children, as well as close family members and friends, and also pet animals.
2. Personal distance begins about an arm's length away; starting around 18 inches (46 cm) from the person and ending about 4 feet (122 cm) away. This space is used in conversations with friends, to chat with associates, and in group discussions.
3. Social distance ranges from 4 to 8 feet (1.2 m - 2.4 m) away from the person and is reserved for strangers, newly formed groups, and new acquaintances.
4. Public distance includes anything more than 8 feet (2.4 m) away, and is used for speeches, lectures, and theater. Public distance is essentially that range reserved for larger audiences.

- Proximity Range varies with culture
- Physical Appearance and Artifacts can largely dictate and have potent effects of the credibility of a speaker, which in turn has a substantial impact on compliance gaining. Physical appearance, clothing, status symbols an individual wears are often potent cue for manipulating behaviors because they signify the ability to socially influence through compliance gaining.
- Chronemics is associated with the perception that time is valuable, often hearing the adage "time is money." The more important we are, the longer the amount of time we want to spend with someone, the more important they are to us.

Nonverbal communication cues can play five roles: Body language

== Nonverbal influence and chronemics ==
There are eight ways to engage in nonverbal communication that can be used towards the influence of change in a behavior or attitude. Some of those forms of nonverbal communication are facial expressions, gestures, and body language.

According to Brian Knutson, facial expressions of emotion allow for animals to predict another animal's behavior. The judgment of a facial expression in one animal can be used to properly gauge a future action during a moment of interpersonal communication. In Knutson's article "Facial Expressions of Emotion Influence Interpersonal Trait Inferences", he speaks on the subject of interpersonal circumplex based on emotions. Based on this model, human emotions communicate messages, and as emotions vary, so must the messages they communicate from source to receiver.

This article outlines two experiments to test the hypothesis that facial expressions influence inferences. In the first separated students into groups given them college credit as an incentive for participation and the second had each student do an individual activity with an incentive of $2.50 for participation. Both experiments had 36 students but used the same images as stimuli. The difference between the two experiments were the sizes of the images and the delivery methods. Experiment one showed large slides to groups of six students and experiment two showed smaller images on a computer screen to individuals. The results showed that the groups in experiment one showed a higher level of influence on affiliation and dominance, conversely, the smaller images of experiment 2 produced lower levels of influence.

Gestures, as with facial expression, communicate differing messages depending on which hand gestures are employed and paired with varying verbal or linguistic communication. As this communication aspect plays a role in interpersonal communication, it also plays a role in nonverbal influence. Gestures fall into different types as defined by Robert M. Krauss, Yihshu Chen, and Purnima Chawla (1996).

The typology of gestures in their research consists of three categories of gestures that include adapter, symbolic, and conversational. Adapters, or normal gestures employed by a speaker or source that may or may not hint to unconscious feelings or thoughts not expressed in the verbal communication. Symbolic are gestures that also seem "word-like" in nature and conversational, which are normally paired with verbal or linguistic communication and tend to be related and coordinated with what is being stated by the speaker or source. This perspective on gestures speaks to the differing meanings behind them. As the messages differ, so do their roles in influencing a receiver. If Conversational gestures, for instance, are not paired properly with the verbal strategy being used to persuade a target audience, then the success of the message could be compromised. When gesturing, as a nonverbal cue and behavior, are paired properly one can effect a change in a behavior or attitude which is the goal of the communication.

== Nonverbal communication and roles ==
In experiments concerning the expression of attitudes and feelings, Mehrabian [Mehrabian(1971)] found that when there was incongruence in verbal and non-verbal messages being communicated, the relative importance of messages was 7% based on verbal liking, 38% on vocal liking and 55% on facial liking: receivers tended to predominantly favor the non-verbal aspects.

In contrast to the literal meaning of the words, during the communication of attitudes and feelings. While the environment, haptic, state of the persuader and appearance of the persuader are also of importance, often restrict the discussion to body language.

== Nonverbal Expectancy Violations Theory ==
Nonverbal expectancy violations theory was developed by Judee K Burgoon, a professor of Communication and Family Studies and Human Development at the University of Arizona and her colleagues. This theory consisted of five assumptions and was first published in the late 1980s.

The model of Nonverbal Expectancy Violations "posits that people hold expectations about the nonverbal behaviors of others" (Burgoon.J &Hale 1988)

An example of a nonverbal expectation or violation can be found in the definition of Expectancy Theory. In the definition the example of a judge's body language is transmitting a negative cue or signal by way of his gaze or his tense mouth and the manner in which his body may seem cut off, as in when an individual crosses their arms in an attempt to convey a tenseness they are not deciding to communicate verbally.

This also speaks to the Clever Hans phenomenon. Clever Hans was a horse in the 19th Century that had the uncanny ability to stamp out using his hooves the correct sum of two numbers people would ask him to add. Oskar Pfungst eventually figured out that the horse had simply paid attention to nonverbal cues of people when he answered correctly or wrongly. Once the horse realized from the reactions of those around him that he had arrived at the right number, he committed that to memory and was able to repeat this action several times afterward. The phenomenon of "Clever Hans", in terms of human beings, means that as we are primates act in a similar fashion, collecting data from the nonverbal cues that those around us use to tell us what is and isn't socially acceptable. We are primates and as such, we are therefore highly susceptible to nonverbal cues.

As shown in research "nonverbal cues play an enormous role in signaling interpersonal expectations, often within the first 30 seconds of an interaction". Research also shows that relaxed postures, physical shows of dominance, as well as showing interested faces or smiling are all signs of positive expectations. Conversely a frown, a scowl, or even eyebrow raising are signs of negative expectations.

There are common expectancy violations in nonverbal communication based on the five assumptions of the model. These five assumptions are that humans have a competing approach and avoidance needs, communicators evaluate the reward potential of others, communicators develop expectations about the nonverbal behaviors of others, nonverbal behaviors have associated evaluations ranging from extremely positive or negative, and nonverbal behaviors have socially recognized meaning.

Just as in Language Expectancy Theory and Expectancy Violation theory, Nonverbal expectancy violations also follow the same pattern of if a positive violation of expectation based on the credibility of source occurs, then it stands that the communication itself will produce a more positive outcome. Conversely, negative violations will produce less favorable communication outcomes. The positivity or negativity of the violation will then be attributed to the message conveyed to an audience or receiver. Source Credibility is determined in most settings based on aspects such as title, education, and outward appearance. Based on these aspects a receiver or the audience can make a judgment of what they are expecting of the source both in linguistic choices and body language and facial expressions coupled with it.

Analysis of message interpretations in Nonverbal Expectancy Violations and Conversational Involvement by Judee Burgoon, Deborah Newton, Joseph B. Walthier, and E. James Baesler indicated that "(1) relative to normal involvement levels, increased nonverbal involvement was interpreted as most immediate/affectionate, receptive, similar, dominant, and compose, and decreased involvement as least so, and (2) reward mediated only the interpretation of formality.".

== See also ==
- Expectancy Violation Theory
- Interpersonal Communication
- French and Raven's five bases of power
