= Ishin-denshin =

Idiom commonly used in East Asia

Ishin-denshin (以心伝心) is an idiom commonly used in East Asian cultures, such as in Japan, Korea and China, which denotes a form of interpersonal communication through unspoken mutual understanding.

== Meaning ==
The four-character compound (yojijukugo) in Japanese, 以心伝心 (lit. "by means of heart, transmitting heart"), is sometimes translated into English as "heart-to-heart communication" in the sense of "immediate communication from one mind to another". It is also sometimes translated as "tacit understanding." Other commonly used translations include "telepathy" and "sympathy". The corresponding compound in Korean is 이심전심 (i-shim-jeon-shim).

Although mutual silent understanding is a universal human phenomenon, there is a widespread belief in Japan that such a form of non-verbal communication is a defining characteristic of national culture (in the mindset of nihonjinron). Whereas the Japanese concept of haragei denotes a deliberate form of nonverbal communication, ishin-denshin refers to a passive form of shared understanding. Ishin-denshin has been traditionally perceived by the Japanese as sincere, silent communication via the heart or belly (i.e. symbolically from the inside, uchi), as distinct from overt communication via the face and mouth (the outside, soto), which is seen as being more susceptible to insincerities.

== History ==
The introduction of this concept to Japan, via China, is related to the traditions of Zen, where the term ishin-denshin refers to direct mind transmission of Buddhist dharma. According to Zen tradition, the concept of ishin-denshin can be traced back to the initial dharma transmission between Gautama Buddha and Mahākāśyapa related in the Flower Sermon.

The belief that ishin-denshin is essential to interpersonal communication continues to influence aspects of contemporary Japanese culture and ethics, ranging from business practices to end-of-life care.

== See also ==
- Ingroups and outgroups
- Sontaku
