= Head bobble =

Gesture; side-to-side tilting of the head to approve

The head bobble, head wobble, or Indian head shake is a common gesture found in South Asian cultures, most notably in India. The motion usually consists of a side-to-side tilting of the head in arcs along the coronal plane. A form of nonverbal communication, it may mean yes, good, maybe, okay, or I understand, depending on the context.

== Usage ==
In India, a head bobble can have a variety of different meanings. Most frequently it means yes, or is used to indicate understanding. The meaning of the head bobble depends on the context of the conversation or encounter. It can serve as an alternative to thank you or as a polite introduction, or it can represent acknowledgement.

Head bobbles can also be used in an intentionally vague manner. An unenthusiastic head bobble can be a polite way of declining something without saying no directly.

The gesture is common throughout India. However, it is used more frequently in South India.

== See also ==
- Head shake
- Nod
