= Nunchi =

Korean phrase

- Hangul: 눈치
- RR: nunchi
- MR: nunch'i

Nunchi, sometimes noonchi (눈치), is a Korean concept signifying the subtle art and ability to listen and gauge others' moods. It first appears in the 17th century as nunch'ŭi (眼勢 in hanja), meaning "eye force/power". In Western culture, nunchi could be described as the concept of emotional intelligence. It is of central importance to the dynamics of interpersonal relationships. Nunchi is literally translated as "eye-measure". Nunchi is closely related to the broader concept of paralanguage but also relies on an understanding of one's status relative to the person with whom they are interacting. It can be seen as the embodiment of skills necessary to communicate effectively in high context culture.

== Overview ==
The concept of nunchi can be difficult to grasp for non-Koreans because there is no direct translation into English. One's abundance of nunchi, or lack thereof, forms the basis of many common expressions and idioms. For example, a socially clumsy person can be described as nunchi eopda (눈치 없다), meaning "absence of nunchi". Writing in the Korea Times, scholar and cultural critic David Tizzard describes the importance of nunchi in Korean life by contrasting it to British culture: "I was raised to stand up straight, look people in the eye, and speak briskly and directly. While that certainly works for the public schools and rugby clubs of England, it’s all a bit different here. You’re meant to listen. To look down. To be slow. And once you get your nunchi sorted, everything else just kind of drops into place. It’s like the whole of society changes and the cold stares suddenly become warm smiles."

Nunchi is briefly defined as the high social sensitivity of Koreans that basically means they are able to ascertain others' moods by being around them and talking to them. They are sensitive to what others say indirectly, because they want to maintain harmony. They sense someone's kibun, a Korean word that relates to mood, current feelings, and the state of mind. Facilitating nunchi, encouraging the use of this skill, is expected to result in rich understanding. It is of central importance to the dynamics of interpersonal relationships. With nunchi, Koreans are using nonverbal cues to convey emotion and meaning through various means, including voice pitch and volume as well as intonation. Because Korea, as with other high-context cultures, caters toward in-groups that have similar experiences and expectations and from which inferences are drawn, many things are left unsaid. The culture does the explaining, in effect. Both kibun and nunchi are very difficult concepts for non-Koreans to get the hang of.

In Korea, personal relations frequently take precedence over business, which can ultimately help get a new job or help make you earn new friends. In order to be successful, it is vital to establish good, personal relationships based on mutual trust and benefit. Koreans judge this by nunchi to get a basic understanding of the individual they just met. Korean business culture is firmly grounded in respectful rapport and in order to establish this, it is essential to have the right introduction to approach the company. Koreans will use nunchi to make sure the right approach is being used, often through a mutual friend or acquaintance at the appropriate level. Koreans spend a significant amount of time developing and fostering personal contacts. Therefore, time should be allocated for this process, particularly during the first meeting, which is frequently used to simply establish rapport and build trust.

The phrase nunchi itda (눈치 있다) refers to someone who is quick-witted, can understand the situation quickly, or has common sense. Another way to say this is nunchi ppareuda (눈치 빠르다), "to have quick nunchi".

== See also ==
- Korean language
- Coup d'œil - military term referring to the ability to discern at one glance the tactical advantages and disadvantages of terrain
- Fingerspitzengefühl - German term, literally meaning "finger tips feeling" and meaning intuitive flair or instinct.
- Tacit knowledge
