= Unconscious communication =

Unconscious verbal and nonverbal cues

Unconscious (or intuitive) communication is the subtle, unintentional, unconscious cues that provide information to another individual. It can be verbal (speech patterns, physical activity while speaking, or the tone of voice of an individual) or it can be non-verbal (facial expressions and body language). Some psychologists instead use the term honest signals because such cues are involuntary behaviors that often convey emotion whereas body language can be controlled. Many decisions are based on unconscious communication, which is interpreted and created in the right hemisphere of the brain. The right hemisphere is dominant in perceiving and expressing body language, facial expressions, verbal cues, and other indications that have to do with emotion but it does not exclusively deal with the unconscious.

Little is known about the unconscious mind or about how decisions are made based on unconscious communications except that they are always unintentional. There are two types of unconscious communications: intrapersonal and interpersonal.

Research has shown that human conscious attention can attend to 5–9 items simultaneously. All other information is processed by the unconscious mind. For example, the unconscious mind sometimes picks up on and relates non-verbal cues about an individual based on how they have arranged their settings such as their home or place of work.

== Unconscious mind ==
Not much is known about the unconscious mind but it is believed to contain the biological instincts that humans act on every day, such as sex and aggression. A person is completely unaware of what happens within the unconscious mind.

Psychoanalyst Sigmund Freud made the concept of the unconscious popular; and he based most of his theories on psychoanalysis on the concept. According to Freud, the subconscious mind rests right below the conscious mind, and has easy access to the thoughts and feelings that are kept in this state – as opposed to the unconscious mind (access to which is, in Freud's view, impossible). Freud believed that we projected our unconscious emotions onto others.

== Intrapersonal ==
Intrapersonal communication is language use or thought internal to the communicator. It includes many mental activities such as thinking, calculating, planning, talking to one's self, internal monologue, and day-dreaming. Intrapersonal communication affects how people perceive themselves: either in a negative or positive way. Joseph Jordania hypothesized that intrapersonal communication was created to avoid silence because as social creatures we feel uncomfortable with extended periods of silence. Intrapersonal unconscious communication is when dreams, previous experiences, or hypnosis affects a person's choices or experiences unconsciously.

== Interpersonal ==
Interpersonal communication includes message sending and message reception between two or more individuals. This can include all aspects of communication such as listening, persuading, asserting, non-verbal communication, and more. Interpersonal unconscious communication includes unintentional facial expressions, body language, tone of voice, and speech patterns while interacting with another individual that the other individual interprets for their own knowledge. Studies suggest that when presented with an emotional facial expression, participants instinctively react with movement in facial muscles that are mimicking the original facial expression.

There are six different reasons for non-verbal communication:

1. Complementing: adding extra information to verbal communication
2. Contradicting: the non-verbal messages contradict one's verbal messages
3. Repeating: emphasize or clarify the verbal message
4. Regulating: coordinate the verbal dialogue between people
5. Substituting: when a non-verbal message is used in place of a verbal message
6. Accenting: emphasizing a particular point in a verbal message

This system may have been evolutionarily evolved to hint to other people emotional cues. When a person uses one of the following points, as stated above (i.e. intonation, facial expression...) they may do so to regulate the emotion of one or more people. The subject or the contents of the message may be less of importance rather than the transmission of emotional cues itself.

Additionally, the manner of phrasing sentences and selection of words that the brain subconsciously generates are used as well to regulate other peoples emotions. Since a particular utilization of words may affect people differently such as "That painting is unattractive." and "That painting is ugly.", whereby the latter sentence will have a worse emotional impact than the former upon hearing. And here again the contents of the message are less of relevance than the actual emotional impact it will deliver.

== See also ==
- Rapport
- Sympathy
- Hypnosis
- Telepathy
- Body language
  - Eye contact
  - Facial expression
  - Human voice
  - Gesture
  - Postures
- Subliminal message
- Tacit knowledge
- Unconscious mind
- Unsaid
