= Gerard Nierenberg =

American lawyer

Gerard Irwin Nierenberg
- Born: July 27, 1923; Queens, New York, US
- Died: September 19, 2012 (aged 89); Manhattan, New York, US
- Occupations: Author, lawyer
- Known for: The Art of Negotiating

Gerard Irwin Nierenberg (27 July 1923 – 19 September 2012) was an American lawyer, author, and expert in negotiation and communication strategy. In 1966 he founded The Negotiation Institute where he began a legacy of government, corporate, and non-profit organizational reform based on his ideas of how negotiation impacts the lives of everyone, and he published 22 books on negotiation. The three core tenets of Nierenberg's philosophy are (1) to be patient; (2) to strive to meet the needs of the opposition party in order to build sustainable relationships from which all parties feel that they have 'won'; and (3) to limit frustrations in all negotiations by embracing the fact that logic does not always lead to negotiated success. Nierenberg left a wife, Juliet, with whom he had three sons: Roy, Roger, and George.

== Early life and law career ==
Nierenberg was born on July 24, 1923, and lived to be 89 years old. He graduated from high school at age 15, and was enrolled in Brooklyn Law School three years later at age 18. In 1942, Nierenberg delayed his law school graduation for two years while he served in the US Army Air Corps. Nierenberg graduated Brooklyn Law School and became a member of the New York State Bar in 1946. He began his career practicing law in various fields and eventually started his own real estate and corporate law practice, Nierenberg, Zief & Weinstein. Nierenberg was also a long-time board member of the Institute of General Semantics.

== Career in negotiation ==
Nierenberg first became interested in pursuing negotiation while practicing law as the result of many negative experiences at the negotiating table. He recognized that parties trying to win negotiations led to unsustainable relationships in business and personal relationships so he created a general framework from which individuals and groups can build long-lasting partnerships. Nierenberg wrote his first book exploring negotiation strategies and tactics, The Art of Negotiating, in 1968. The book's premise follows his belief that negotiation is a skill, not an inherited talent, so everyone may benefit from advancing their own negotiation skill level. His first book became a handbook to many professionals and his subsequent books were aimed to focus on specific topics within the areas of negotiation and communication. Through his research, Nierenberg developed a negotiation ideology based on the principle that "in a successful negotiation, everybody wins."

Nierenberg's expertise led him into roles as a consultant and trainer working with Fortune 500 companies, academic institutions, and government agencies across the globe. In 1966, Nierenberg founded The Negotiation Institute, which leads seminars for organizations seeking to bolster human resources by improving negotiation and communication skills. Since then, Nierenberg's 22 books on negotiation and communication have been translated into over 30 languages. Nierenberg held the title of Chairman Emeritus of The Negotiation Institute and President of Human Rights Advocates International, an NGO member of the United Nations, until his death.

Forbes named Nierenberg "the father of negotiation training" for his exploration of negotiation strategies and tactics as well as his decades of work disseminating the philosophy that "in a successful negotiation, everybody wins".

== Books ==
Nierenberg wrote 22 books on negotiation. Some of his most popular books include:

- How to Read a Person Like a Book co-authored with Henry H. Calero
- The Art of Negotiating
- The New Art of Negotiating–Updated Edition: How to Close Any Deal co-authored with Henry H. Calero
- The Art of Creative Thinking
- Meta-Talk: The Guide to Hidden Meanings in Conversations co-authored with Henry H. Calero
