= Fingerspitzengefühl =

German saying adopted by the English language

Fingerspitzengefühl [ˈfɪŋɐˌʃpɪtsənɡəˌfyːl] is a German term, literally meaning "finger tips feeling" and meaning intuitive flair or instinct. It describes a great situational awareness, and the ability to respond most appropriately and tactfully. It can also be applied to diplomats, bearers of bad news, or to describe a superior ability to respond to an escalated situation. The term is sometimes used to describe the instinctive play of certain football players.

== Social context ==
In social context, Fingerspitzengefühl suggests a combination of "tact, diplomacy and a certain amount of sensitivity to the feelings of others". It is a quality that can enable a person to "negotiate tricky social situations". In literal terms, it means a physical skill appearing to be controlled by the nerves in the extremities, as in a machinist hand lathing steel to micrometer tolerances.

== Military context ==
In military terminology, it is used for the stated ability of some military commanders, such as Field-Marshal Erwin Rommel, to describe "the instinctive and immediate response to battle situations", a quality needed to maintain, with great accuracy and attention to detail, an ever-changing operational and tactical situation by maintaining a mental map of the battlefield. The idiom is intended to evoke a military commander who is in such intimate communication with the battlefield that it is as though he has a fingertip on each critical point. In this sense the term is synonymous with the English expression of "keeping one's finger on the pulse", and was expressed in the 18th and 19th centuries as "having a feel for combat".

The term is only figurative, and cannot in itself give a realistic picture of the ability being described. It is cognitively related to personal possession of multiple intelligences, notably those pertinent to visual and spatial data processing. The term suggests that in addition to any discursive processing of information that the commander may be conducting (such as mentally considering a specific plan), the commander is automatically establishing cognitive relationships between disparate pieces of information as they arrive, and is able to immediately re-synthesise their mental model of the battlefield.

Even though there is no physical connection between the commander and his troops, other than conduits for discursive information such as radio signals, it is as if the commander had their own sensitive presence in each spot.

One of the functions of a static map is to allow a traveler to decide upon a course of action suitable for getting from one point to another. In times of war, the terrain and the troops and weapons deployed upon it can be changed much more rapidly than cartographers can change their maps. A commander with Fingerspitzengefühl would hold such a map in their mind, and adjust it by incorporating any significant information that was received.

== Related concepts ==
The concept may be compared to ideas about intuition and neural net programming. The same phenomenon, but conceptualized in a radically different way, seems to be described by D.T. Suzuki in swordsmanship teaching stories recounted in his Zen and Japanese Culture, and given in analytical detail in Zen Buddhism and Psychoanalysis.

== See also ==
- C^{4}ISTAR
- Command and control (military)
- Coup d'œil
- Fog of war
- Network-centric warfare
