= Head shake =

Gesture

Example of head shake

A head shake is a gesture in which the head is turned left and right along the transverse plane repeatedly in quick succession. In many cultures, it is most commonly, but not universally, used to indicate disagreement, denial, or rejection. It can also signify disapproval or upset at a situation, often with slower movement.

== To indicate rejection ==
Different cultures assign different meanings to the gesture. Shaking to indicate "no" is widespread, and appears in a large number of diverse cultural and linguistic groups. Areas in which head shaking generally takes this meaning include the Indian subcontinent, the Middle East, Africa, Southeast Asia, Europe, South America, North America and Australia.

== To indicate approval ==
However, in some Southeastern European areas such as southern Albania, it is used for the opposite purpose, to indicate affirmation, meaning "yes". In those regions, nodding in fact means "no", the complete reverse of most other places in the world.

== Origin ==
There are varying theories as to why head shake is so frequently used to mean "no".

An early survey of head shake and other gestures was The Expression of the Emotions in Man and Animals, written by Charles Darwin in 1872. Darwin wrote to missionaries in many parts of the world asking for information on local gestures, and concluded that shaking head for "no" was common to many different groups. He also observed that babies, when hungry, search for their mother's milk by moving their heads vertically, but decline milk by turning their head from side to side.

== See also ==
- Head bobble
- Nod
