= Nod (gesture) =

Up and down movement of the head

Depiction of a person nodding

A nod of the head is a gesture in which a person tilts the head once or more in alternating up and down arcs along the sagittal plane. In many cultures, it is most commonly, but not universally, used to indicate agreement or as a greeting. English-speakers may use "beck" as a synonym of "nod".

== To indicate acceptance ==
Different cultures assign different meanings to the gesture. Nodding to indicate "yes" is widespread, and appears in a large number of diverse cultural and linguistic groups. Areas in which nodding generally takes this meaning include the Indian subcontinent (note that the head bobble also shows agreement there), the Middle East, Southeast Asia, most of Europe, South America and North America. Nodding may also be used as a sign of recognition in some areas, or to show respect. An insult may be inferred if it is not returned in kind.

In Greece, the single nod of the head down that indicates "yes" is often combined with closing the eyes simultaneously. This nod commonly also includes a very slight, almost unnoticeable, turn of the head to the left or right.

An early survey of nodding and other gestures was The Expression of the Emotions in Man and Animals, written by Charles Darwin in 1872. Darwin wrote to missionaries in many parts of the world asking for information on local gestures, and concluded that nodding for "yes" was common to many different groups.

Darwin suggested that babies, when hungry, search for milk by moving their heads vertically, but decline milk by turning their head from side to side.

== To indicate refusal ==
There are several exceptions: in Greece, Cyprus, Iran, Turkey, Bulgaria, a single nod of the head up but not down indicates a "no". Some cultures also swap the meanings between nodding and head shaking.

Specifically in Greece and in Cyprus, the single nod of the head up that indicates "no" is almost always combined with a simultaneous raise of the eyebrows and most commonly also with a slight (or complete) rolling up of the eyes. The dental click sound, called "τσου" (tsou) in Greek, often accompanies this gesture. This gesture with this sound is also common in Sicily. This sound bears heavy resemblance, but is not identical, to the British tutting sound.

== As a greeting ==
Nodding may also be used as a form of nonverbal greeting or acknowledgement of another's presence; in this context, it is essentially an especially mild form of bowing, with just enough movement to show a degree of respect without additional formality. This includes the traditional downwards nod, or the upwards nod (which is more informal and usually used among friends or subordinates). To increase the formality, the downwards nod may also be accompanied by a suitable verbal greeting.

In the United States, men often greet other men with whom they make eye contact using a nod. This greeting is often referred to as "the nod". It has been claimed that "many men feel a great deal can be intuited from the gesture [...] replete with all sorts of little nuances." Erving Goffman argued that strangers in public spaces perform brief rituals of acknowledgement while simultaneously signalling non-threat and non-engagement, a process he termed civil inattention.

== Nodding disease ==
Nodding is also a symptom of nodding disease, an as-yet unexplained disease. It affects mostly children under 15, and was first documented in Tanzania in 1962.

== See also ==
- Head shake
- Physical distancing
- Hat tip
