= Coup d'œil =

Military jargon

Coup d'œil (or coup d'oeil; French: Coup d'œil [ku dœj], lit. 'glimpse, glance, stroke of [the] eye') is a military term referring to the ability to discern at one glance the tactical advantages and disadvantages of the terrain. For example, King Frederick the Great of Prussia in his "Military Instruction from the Late King of Prussia to His Generals" devotes special attention to the military coup d'œil, defining it as:

[T]he perfection of that art to learn at one just and determined view the benefits and disadvantages of a country where posts are to be placed and how to act upon the annoyance of the enemy. This is, in a word, the true meaning of a coup d'œil, without which an officer may commit errors of the greatest consequence.

The phrase increased in usage following its use by Clausewitz in the tome On War to denote good generalship. Napoleon, Folard, and Liddell Hart also recognized it as necessary for a good general.

The coup d'œil remains important for officers in modern armies for the positioning of infantry, tanks, artillery, and other resources. It is also important for snipers, or infantry operating weapons like anti-tank weapons, in order to find good concealment, cover and a good field of fire.

In current French, the phrase simply means "glimpse." For example, it is often used in marketing materials in the same way that "At a glance..." is used in English to title a product summary.

== See also ==
- Fingerspitzengefühl
- Rock of eye
