= List of emoticons =

A simple smiley

This is a list of emoticons or textual portrayals of a writer's moods or facial expressions in the form of icons. Originally, these icons consisted of ASCII art, and later, Shift JIS art and Unicode art. In recent times, graphical icons, both static and animated, have joined the traditional text-based emoticons; these are commonly known as emoji.

Emoticons can generally be divided into three groups: Western (mainly from United States and Europe) or horizontal (though not all are in that orientation); Eastern or vertical (mainly from East Asia); and 2channel style (originally used on 2channel and other Japanese message boards). The most common explanation for these different styles is that in the East, the eyes play the primary role in facial expressions, while in the West, the whole face tends to be used.

== Western ==
Western style emoticons are mostly written from left to right as though the head is rotated counter-clockwise 90 degrees. One will most commonly see the eyes on the left, followed by the nose (often omitted) and then the mouth. Typically, a colon is used for the eyes of a face, unless winking, in which case a semicolon is used. However, an equals sign, a number 8, a capital letter B or a capital letter X are also used to indicate normal eyes, widened eyes, those with glasses or those with crinkled eyes, respectively. Symbols for the mouth vary, e.g., ")" for a smiley face or "(" for a sad face. One can also add a "}" after the mouth character to indicate a beard.

Sideways Latin-only emoticons
| Icon | | | | | | | | | | Emoji | Meaning |
|---|---|---|---|---|---|---|---|---|---|---|---|
| :‑) :) | :-] :] | :-> :> | 8-); 8) | :-} :} | :^) | =] | =) | | | ☺️🙂😊😀😁 | Smiley, happy face |
| :‑D :D | 8‑D; 8D | =D | =3 | B^D | c: | C: | | | | 😃😄😎 | Laughing, big grin, grinning with glasses |
| x‑D xD | X‑D; XD | | | | | | | | | 😆😂 | Laughing |
| :-)) :)) | | | | | | | | | | | Very happy or double chin |
| :‑( :( | :‑c :c | :‑< :< | :‑[ :[ | :-|| | | :{ | :@ | :( | ;( | ☹️🙁😞😟😣😖 | Frown, sad, pouting |
| :'‑( :'( | :=( | | | | | | | | | 😢😭 | Crying |
| :'‑) :') | :"D | | | | | | | | | 🥲🥹😂 | Tears of happiness |
| >:( | >:[ | | | | | | | | | 😠😡 | Angry |
| D‑': | D:< | D: | D8 | D; | D= | DX | | | | 😨😧😦😱😫😩 | Horror, disgust, sadness, great dismay (right to left) |
| :‑O :O | :‑o :o | :-0 :0 | 8‑0 | >:O | =O =o | =0 | | | | 😮😯😲 | Surprise, shock |
| :-3 :3 | =3 | x3 X3 | | | | | | | | 😺😸🐱 | Cat face, curled mouth, cutesy, playful, mischievous |
| >:3 | | | | | | | | | | 😼 | Lion smile, evil cat, playfulness |
| :-* :* | :x | | | | | | | | | 😗😙😚😘😍 | Kiss |
| ;‑);) | *-) *) | ;‑];] | ;^);> | :‑, | ;D | ;3 | | | | 😉😜😘 | Wink, smirk |
| :‑P :P | X‑P; XP | x‑p xp | :‑p :p | :‑Þ :Þ | :‑þ :þ | :‑b :b | d: | =p | >:b | 😛😝😜🤑 | Tongue sticking out, cheeky/playful, blowing a raspberry |
| :-/ :/ | ',:^I | >:\ | >:/ | :\ | =/ | =\ | :L | =L | :S | 🫤🤔😕😟 | Skeptical, annoyed, undecided, uneasy, hesitant |
| :‑| :| | | | | | | | | | | 😐😑 | Straight face no expression, indecision |
| :$ | ://) ://3 | | | | | | | | | 😳😞😖 | Embarrassed, blushing |
| :‑X :X | :‑# :# | :‑& :& | | | | | | | | 🤐😶 | Sealed lips, wearing braces, tongue-tied |
| O:‑); O:) | 0:‑3; 0:3 | 0:‑); 0:) | 0;^) | | | | | | | 😇👼 | Angel, halo, saint, innocent |
| >:‑) >:) | }:‑) }:) | 3:‑); 3:) | >;‑) >;) | >:3 >;3 | | | | | | 😈 | Evil, devilish |
| |;‑) | |‑O | B-) | | | | | | | | 😎😪 | Cool, bored, yawning |
| :‑J | | | | | | | | | | 😏😒 | Tongue-in-cheek |
| #‑) | | | | | | | | | | 🥴 | Partied all night |
| %‑) %) | | | | | | | | | | 😵😵‍💫😕🤕 | Drunk, confused |
| :‑###.. :###.. | | | | | | | | | | 🤒😷🤢 | Being sick |
| <:‑| | | | | | | | | | | | Dumb, dunce-like |
| ',:-| | ',:-l | | | | | | | | | 🤨 | Scepticism, disbelief, disapproval |
| :E | | | | | | | | | | 😬 | Grimacing, nervous, awkward |
| 8-X | 8=X | x-3 | x=3 | | | | | | | ☠️💀🏴‍☠️ | Skull and crossbones |
| ~:> | | | | | | | | | | 🐔🐓 | Chicken |

Sideways Latin-only single-line art and portraits
| Icon | | | | | | Emoji | Meaning |
|---|---|---|---|---|---|---|---|
| @};- | @}->-- | @}‑;‑'‑‑‑ | @>‑‑>‑‑ | | | 🌹 | Rose |
| 8====D | 8===D | 8=D | 3=D | 8=> | 8===D~~~ | 🍆🍌🌭 | Penis, Ejaculation |
| *<|:‑) | | | | | | 🎅 | Santa Claus |
| </3 | <\3 | | | | | 💔 | Broken heart |
| <3 | s2 | | | | | ❤️ | Heart |

Upright Latin-only emoticons and single-line art and portraits
| Icon | | | | | Emoji | Meaning |
|---|---|---|---|---|---|---|
| ><> | <>< | | <*)))‑{ | ><(((*> | 🐟🐠 | Fish, something's fishy, Ichthys |
| o/ \o | | | | | 👋 | Waving hello, or half of high-five |
| \o/ | | | | | 🍻 | Cheer "Yay, yay." |
| *\0/* | | | | | | Cheerleader |
| o7 | | | | | 🫡 | Salute |
| v.v | ._. | ._.; | | | 😔 | Sadness, great dismay, disgust |
| ;-; | T_T T-T | QQ | Qq | qq | 🥺😭😢 | Crying |
| X_X x_x | +_+ | X_x x_X | | | 😵☠️ | Dead person, fainted |
| <_< | >_> | <.< | >.> | | | Sideways look, devious or guilty |
| O_O o_o | O-O o‑o | O_o | o_O | | 😳 | Surprise, shock, yawn |
| >.< | | >_< | | | 😣 | Skeptical, annoyed, undecided, uneasy, hesitant |
| ^5 | o/\o | >_>^ ^<_< | | | 🙏 | High five |
| V.v.V | V=(° °)=V | | | | 🦀🦞 | Crab, lobster |
| (^^^) | | | | | 🦈 | Shark |
| (::[]::) | | | | | 🩹🤕❤️‍🩹 | Bandage |
| (o)(o) ( • )( • ) ( . Y . ) | | | | | | Breasts |

Upright Unicode-incorporating emoticons and single-line art
| Icon | | | | Emoji | Meaning |
|---|---|---|---|---|---|
| ӽd̲̅a̲̅r̲̅w̲̅i̲̅ɳ̲̅ᕗ | Ӽd̲̅a̲̅r̲̅w̲̅i̲̅ɳ̲̅ᕗ | ӽe̲̅v̲̅o̲̅l̲̅u̲̅t̲̅i̲̅o̲̅ɳ̲̅ᕗ | Ӽe̲̅v̲̅o̲̅l̲̅u̲̅t̲̅i̲̅o̲̅ɳ̲̅ᕗ | 🐟🐠 | Darwin fish, evolution fish |
| [̲̅$̲̅(̲̅1̲̅)̲̅$̲̅] | [̲̅$̲̅(̲̅5̲̅)̲̅$̲̅] | [̲̅$̲̅(̲̅1̲̅0̲̅)̲̅$̲̅] | [̲̅$̲̅(̲̅ιοο̲̅)̲̅$̲̅] | 💵💸 | Dollar notes |
| ( ͡° ͜ʖ ͡°) | | | | 😏 | The "Lenny Face", named and popularized on 4chan. Used mostly to suggest mischief, imply sexual innuendo or a second hidden meaning behind a sentence, or is pasted over and over to spam online discussions. |
| ヽ༼ຈل͜ຈ༽ﾉ | | | | | "Raise Your Dongers", a meme originated from Twitch, unclear meaning |
| ಠ_ಠ | ಠ__ಠ | ಠ益ಠ | | 😐😑🤨 | "Look of Disapproval" |
| ⎛⎝(•ⱅ•)⎠⎞ | ◥▅◤ | ◢▅◣ | | 🦇 | Bat |
| (๑ˇεˇ๑) | | | | 😘 | Kiss |
| (◕‿◕✿) | | | | 🙂🌸 | "Flower Girl", a person with a flower attached to their head |
| ( ༎ຶ ۝ ༎ຶ ) | | | | 😭 | Crying |
| (=ʘᆽʘ=)∫ | | ฅ(^•ﻌ•^ฅ) | | 🐱 | Cat |
| ʕ •ᴥ•ʔ | ʕ ·(エ)· ʔ | ʕ – ㉨ – ʔ | ⊂(￣(ｴ)￣)⊃ | 🐻🧸🐻‍❄️🐼 | Bear |

== Eastern ==
Eastern emoticons generally are not rotated sideways, and may include non-Latin characters to allow for additional complexity. These emoticons first arose in Japan, where they are referred to as kaomoji (literally "face characters"). The base form consists of a sequence of an opening round parenthesis, a character for the left eye, a character for the mouth or nose, a character for the right eye and a closing round parenthesis. The parentheses are often omitted for well-known kaomoji. The mouth/nose part may also be omitted if the eyes are much more important.

Most East Asian characters are usually inscribed in an invisible square with a fixed width. Although there is also a history of half-width characters, many Japanese, Korean and Chinese fonts include full-width forms for the letters of the basic roman alphabet and also include digits and punctuation as found in US ASCII. These fixed-width forms are also available in Unicode. Mostly depending on the input mode available, kaomoji may use these Eastern forms of Western characters, but hardly ever rely on any particular width to be discernible.

Kaomoji faces
| Icon | Emoji | Meaning |
|---|---|---|
| (>_<)(>_<)>(>w<) | 😣😖 | Troubled |
| (';') | 👶 | Baby |
| (^^ゞ(^_^;)(-_-;)(~_~;) (・.・;)(・_・;)(・・;)^^;^_^;(#^.^#)(^^;) | 😅😳😓😥 | Nervous, embarrassed, troubled, shy, sweat drop |
| (/ /•/ω/•/ /) | 😳 | Embarrassed, flushed |
| (^.^)y-.o○(-.-)y-°°° | 🚬 | Smoking |
| (-_-)zzz | 😴💤 | Sleeping |
| (^_-)(^_-)-☆ | 😉😜 | Wink |
| ((+_+))(+o+)(°°)(°-°) (°.°)(°_°)(°_°>)(°レ°) | 😕😶😵🙄 | Confused |
| (o|o) | | Ultraman |
| <(｀^´)> | | —N/a |
| ^_^(°o°)(^_^)/(^O^)／(^o^)／(^^)/ (≧∇≦)/(/◕ヮ◕)/(^o^)丿∩(·ω·)∩(·ω·)^ω^ | 😀😅😆😃😄🙌 | Joyful |
| (__)_(._.)__(_^_)_<(_ _)> <m(__)m>m(__)mm(_ _)m | 🙇 | Kowtow as a sign of respect, or dogeza for apology |
| (凸ಠ益ಠ)凸 | 🖕 | Middle fingers |
| ＼(°ロ＼)(／ロ°)／ | 🤔 | Questioning |
| ('_')(/_;)(T_T)(;_;(;_;)(;_:)(:_;)(;O;)(ToT)(Ｔ▽Ｔ);_;;-;;n;;; Q.QT.TTnTQQQ_Q | 😭😢 | Sad, crying |
| (ー_ー)!!(-.-)(-_-)(一一)(；一_一) | 😒😩😑😞😔 | Shame |
| (=_=) | 😫😩😪 | Tired |
| (=^・^=)(=^・・^=)=^_^= | 😺😸😹😻😼😽🙀😿😾🐱 | Cat |
| (..)(._.) | 🙍😔 | Looking down in sadness or boredom |
| ^m^ | 🤭 | Giggling with hand covering mouth |
| (・・?(?_?) | 😕😵 | Confusion |
| (－‸ლ) | 🤦 | Facepalm |
| >^_^<<^!^>^/^（*^_^*）§^.^§(^<^) (^.^)(^ム^)(^·^)(^.^)(^_^.)(^_^)(^^) (^J^)(*^.^*)^_^(#^.^#)（^—^） | 😃😄☺️😁😀😍 | Normal laugh |
| (^^)/~~~(^_^)/~(;_;)/~~~(^.^)/~~~(-_-)/~~~ ($··)/~~~(@^^)/~~~(T_T)/~~~(ToT)/~~~ | 👋 | Waving |
| ＼(~o~)／＼(^o^)／＼(-o-)／ ヽ(^。^)ノヽ(^o^)丿(*^0^*) | 😍😀🙌💃 | Excited |
| (*_*)(*_*;(+_+) (@_@)(@_@。(＠_＠;)＼(◎o◎)／！ | 😍 | Amazed |
| !(^^)! | | —N/a |
| (*^^)v(^^)v(^_^)v（’-’*) (＾ｖ＾)(＾▽＾)(・∀・)(´∀`)(⌒▽⌒） | 😂✌️ | Laughing, cheerful |
| ＼(^o^)／\(^o^)/ | | Hopeless |
| (~o~)(~_~) | 😔😒😏 | —N/a |
| (^^ゞ | 😙😚 | —N/a |
| ˊ＿>ˋ | | Calmness |
| (p_-)(-_q) | 🧐 | —N/a |
| ((d[-_-]b)) | 🎧 | Headphones, listening to music |
| (-"-)(ーー゛)(^_^メ)(-_-メ)(~_~メ)(－－〆) (・へ・)(｀´)<`～´><`ヘ´>(ーー;) | 😟😓😬 | Worried |
| (^0_0^) | 🤓😎 | Eyeglasses |
| ( ..)φφ(..) | ✍️📝 | Jotting note |
| (●＾o＾●)(＾ｖ＾)(＾ｕ＾)(＾◇＾) ( ^)o(^ )(^O^)(^o^)(^○^))^o^( (*^▽^*)(✿◠‿◠) | 😀😁😆😅😃😄 | Happy |
| (￣ー￣) | 😁 | Grinning |
| (￣□￣;)°o°°O°:Oo_Oo_0o.O(o.o)oO | 😲😮😯 | Surprised |
| (*´▽｀*)(*°∀°)=3 | | Infatuation |
| ᕕ( ᐛ )ᕗ | 💃🕺 | Dancing, swinging arms back and forth, "Happy Gary" |
| （ ﾟ Дﾟ)(°◇°) | 😨😱😮😲 | Shocked, surprised |
| (*￣m￣) | 😬😠😡 | Dissatisfied |
| ヽ(´ー｀)┌¯\_(ツ)_/¯¯\(°_o)/¯ | 🤷 | Mellow, shrug, shruggie |
| (´･ω･`)(‘A`) | | Snubbed or deflated |
| (づ￣ ³￣)づ | 🫂😙 | Hugging/reaching and kissing |
| (*^3^)/~☆ | 😘😚😙😗 | Blowing a kiss |
| .....φ(・∀・＊) | | Studying |
| (-_-) zzz(︶｡︶✽) | 😴💤 | Sleeping |
| uwuUwU | 😌 | Joy or Cute |
| OWOOwO | | Associated with the response, "what's this?". Could also be used to denote cute, inquisitive or perplexed, sometimes associated with the furry fandom. |
| 囧 | 😩😫 | Distress. Jiong, a Chinese character meaning a "patterned window", now repurposed as an ideographic emoticon. |

Other Eastern emoticons
| Icon | Emoji | Meaning |
|---|---|---|
| .o○○o. | 🫧 | Bubbles |
| ( ^^)_U~~( ^^)_旦~~ | 🍵☕️ | Cup of tea |
| ☆彡☆ミᯓ✦ | 🌠☄️💫🌟 | Shooting star |
| >°)))彡(Q))><ヨヨ(°))<<>°))))彡<°)))彡>°))彡 <+))><<<*))>=< | 🐠🐟🐡🦈🐬🐳🐋 | Fish |
| <コ:彡 Ｃ:.ミ | 🦑🐙 | Squid, octopus |
| ~>°)～～～ | 🐍 | Snake |
| ～°·_·°～ | 🦇 | Bat |
| (°°)～ | | Tadpole |
| ●～* | 💣🧨 | Bomb |
| ￣|○STOOTZOTLorz囧rz | | Despair. The "O"s represent head on the ground, "T" or "r" forms the torso, and "S" or "z" the legs. |
| (╯°□°)╯︵ ┻━┻┬──┬ ¯\_(ツ) ┻━┻︵ヽ(`Д´)ﾉ︵ ┻━┻┬─┬ノ( º _ ºノ) (ノಠ益ಠ)ノ彡┻━┻ | | Table flip |
| |:3ミ | | —N/a |

== 2channel emoticons ==
A number of Eastern emoticons were originally developed on the Japanese discussion site 2channel. Some of these are wider (made up of more characters) than usual kaomoji, or extend over multiple lines of text. Many use characters from other character sets besides Japanese and Latin.

2channel emoticons
| Icon | Meaning |
|---|---|
| m(_ _)m | Kowtow as a sign of respect, or dogeza for apology |
| (´･ω･`) | Snubbed or deflated |
| (`･ω･´) | Feel perky |
| (｀-´)> | Salute |
| (´；ω；`) | Terribly sad |
| ヽ(´ー｀)ﾉ | Peace of mind |
| ヽ(`Д´)ﾉ | Be irritable |
| (＃ﾟДﾟ) | Angry |
| （ ´Д｀） | Yelling, or panting |
| （ ﾟДﾟ） | Surprised, or loudmouthed |
| ┐('～`；)┌ | Don't know the answer |
| （´∀｀） | Carefree |
| （ ´_ゝ`） | Indifferent |
| Σ(゜д゜;) | Shocked |
| ( ﾟヮﾟ) | Happy, upbeat |
| ⊂二二二（^{＾}ω^{＾}）二⊃ | "Bu-n", being carefree and above, with arms stretched out while running/soaring |
| (((( ；ﾟДﾟ))) | Spook |
| Σ(ﾟДﾟ) | Huge surprise |
| ( ´∀｀)σ)∀`) | Jog (poke) someone's cheek |
| ( ﾟдﾟ) | Amazed |
| (´ー`)y-~~ | Smoking |
| （ ^_^）o自自o（^_^ ） | Toast "Cheers" |
| m9(・∀・) | Flash of intuition |
| ヽ(´ー`)人(´∇｀)人(`Д´)ノ | Friendly |
| ('A`) | Lonely |
| （ ´,_ゝ`) | Depressed, unsatisfied (based on indifferent) |
| （´-`）.｡oO( ... ) | Thinking |
| (ﾟДﾟ;≡;ﾟДﾟ) | Impatience |
| ( ´д)ﾋｿ(´Д｀)ﾋｿ(Д｀) | Whispers |
| （･∀･)つ⑩ | Carrying money |
| ⊂（ﾟДﾟ⊂⌒｀つ≡≡≡(´⌒;;;≡≡≡ | Sliding on belly, "whooaaa!!!" |
| (ﾟдﾟ) | Unforeseen |
| (ﾟ⊿ﾟ) | "I don't need it" |
| щ(ﾟДﾟщ) (屮ﾟДﾟ)屮 | Come on |
| （・∀・） | Mocking, "good" |
| （・Ａ・） | "That's bad" |
| (ﾟ∀ﾟ) | Discharged drug-in-brain, goofing around, "A-HYA!" |
| （つ Д ｀） | Sad |
| エェェ(´д｀)ェェエ | Not convincing |
| (￣ー￣) | Simper, Snorlax |
| [ﾟдﾟ] | Deflagged |
| ♪┏(・o･)┛♪┗ ( ･o･) ┓ | Happy expressions, dancing to the music |
| d(*⌒▽⌒*)b | Happy expression |
| ＿￣ | Given up. Despair. The "O"s represent head on the ground, "T" or "r" forms the torso, and "S" or "z" the legs. |
| STO | Given up. Despair. The "O"s represent head on the ground, "T" or "r" forms the torso, and "S" or "z" the legs. |
| OTZ | Given up. Despair. The "O"s represent head on the ground, "T" or "r" forms the torso, and "S" or "z" the legs. |
| OTL | Given up. Despair. The "O"s represent head on the ground, "T" or "r" forms the torso, and "S" or "z" the legs. |
| (╬ ಠ益ಠ) | Extreme Distaste, meant to appear as an exaggerated grimace |
| (≧ロ≦) | Shouting |
| (ΘεΘ;) | Pretending not to notice, asleep because of boredom |
| ＼ ￣ヘ￣ | Kick |
| ┌(；`～,)┐ | Discombobulated |
| ε=ε=ε=┌(;*´Д`)ﾉ | Running |
| ヽ(´▽`)/ | Happy |
| ^ㅂ^ | Happy |
| (l'o'l) | Shocked |
| ヽ(o`皿′o)ﾉ | Really angry |
| (☞ﾟヮﾟ)☞ | "Do it" |
| ☜(ﾟヮﾟ☜) | "Do it" |
| ☜(⌒▽⌒)☞ | Angel |

2channel emoticons containing Japanese phrases
| Icon | Meaning |
|---|---|
| キタ━━━(゜∀゜)━━━!!!!! | "It's here", Kitaa!, excitement that something has appeared or happened or "I came". |
| ｷﾀﾜァ*･゜ﾟ･*:.｡..｡.:*･゜(n‘∀‘)ηﾟ･*:.｡. .｡.:*･゜ﾟ･*!!!!! | Girlish version of "It's here". |
| (*´Д`)ﾊｧﾊｧ | Erotic stirring, haa haa |
| ( ´Д｀)ﾉ(´･ω･`) ﾅﾃﾞﾅﾃﾞ | Patting, nade nade |
| (*ﾟﾉOﾟ)<ｵｵｵｵｫｫｫｫｫｫｫｰｰｰｰｰｲ! | Calling out, "Ooooi!" |
| ( ﾟ∀ﾟ)ｱﾊﾊ八八ﾉヽﾉヽﾉヽﾉ ＼ / ＼/ ＼ | Evil laugh (literally ahahaHAHA...) |
| （・∀・ ）ヾ(- -；)コラコラ | Blaming "now now" |
| お(^o^)や(^O^)す(^｡^)みぃ(^-^)ﾉﾞ | Kana reading "O ya su mi" meaning "Good night" or "Night" |

== Unicode characters ==
Many emoticons are included as characters in the Unicode standard, in the Miscellaneous Symbols block, the Emoticons block, and the Supplemental Symbols and Pictographs block.

Miscellaneous Symbols (partial)^{[1]}^{[2]}^{[3]} Official Unicode Consortium code chart (PDF)
| | 0 | 1 | 2 | 3 | 4 | 5 | 6 | 7 | 8 | 9 | A | B | C | D | E | F |
| U+263x | ☹ | ☺ | ☻ | | | | | | | | | | | | | |
Notes 1.As of Unicode version 18.0 2.Empty areas indicate code points assigned to non-emoticon characters 3.U+263A and U+263B are inherited from Microsoft code page 437 introduced in 1981, although inspired by older systems

Emoticons^{[1]} Official Unicode Consortium code chart (PDF)
| | 0 | 1 | 2 | 3 | 4 | 5 | 6 | 7 | 8 | 9 | A | B | C | D | E | F |
| U+1F60x | 😀 | 😁 | 😂 | 😃 | 😄 | 😅 | 😆 | 😇 | 😈 | 😉 | 😊 | 😋 | 😌 | 😍 | 😎 | 😏 |
| U+1F61x | 😐 | 😑 | 😒 | 😓 | 😔 | 😕 | 😖 | 😗 | 😘 | 😙 | 😚 | 😛 | 😜 | 😝 | 😞 | 😟 |
| U+1F62x | 😠 | 😡 | 😢 | 😣 | 😤 | 😥 | 😦 | 😧 | 😨 | 😩 | 😪 | 😫 | 😬 | 😭 | 😮 | 😯 |
| U+1F63x | 😰 | 😱 | 😲 | 😳 | 😴 | 😵 | 😶 | 😷 | 😸 | 😹 | 😺 | 😻 | 😼 | 😽 | 😾 | 😿 |
| U+1F64x | 🙀 | 🙁 | 🙂 | 🙃 | 🙄 | 🙅 | 🙆 | 🙇 | 🙈 | 🙉 | 🙊 | 🙋 | 🙌 | 🙍 | 🙎 | 🙏 |
Notes 1.As of Unicode version 18.0

Supplemental Symbols and Pictographs (partial)^{[1]} Official Unicode Consortium code chart (PDF)
| | 0 | 1 | 2 | 3 | 4 | 5 | 6 | 7 | 8 | 9 | A | B | C | D | E | F |
| U+1F91x | 🤐 | 🤑 | 🤒 | 🤓 | 🤔 | 🤕 | 🤖 | 🤗 | 🤘 | 🤙 | 🤚 | 🤛 | 🤜 | 🤝 | 🤞 | 🤟 |
| U+1F92x | 🤠 | 🤡 | 🤢 | 🤣 | 🤤 | 🤥 | 🤦 | 🤧 | 🤨 | 🤩 | 🤪 | 🤫 | 🤬 | 🤭 | 🤮 | 🤯 |
| U+1F93x | 🤰 | 🤱 | 🤲 | 🤳 | 🤴 | 🤵 | 🤶 | 🤷 | 🤸 | 🤹 | 🤺 | 🤻 | 🤼 | 🤽 | 🤾 | 🤿 |
Notes 1.As of Unicode version 18.0
