= Emoticons (Unicode block) =

- Range: U+1F600..U+1F64F (80 code points)
- Plane: SMP
- Scripts: Common
- Symbol sets: Emoji; Emoticons
- Assigned: 80 code points
- Unused: 0 reserved code points

Unicode version history
- 6.0 (2010): 63 (+63)
- 6.1 (2012): 76 (+13)
- 7.0 (2014): 78 (+2)
- 8.0 (2015): 80 (+2)

Unicode documentation
- Code chart ∣ Web page

Emoticons is a Unicode block containing emoticons or emoji. Most of them are intended as representations of faces, although some of them include hand gestures or non-human characters (a horned "imp", monkeys, cartoon cats).

The block was first proposed in 2008, and first implemented in Unicode version 6.0 (2010). The reason for its adoption was largely for compatibility with a de facto standard that had been established by the early 2000s by Japanese telephone carriers, encoded in unused ranges with lead bytes 0xF5 to 0xF9 of the Shift JIS standard. KDDI has gone much further than this, and has introduced hundreds more in the space with lead bytes 0xF3 and 0xF4.

== Descriptions ==
1F600	😀	grinning face
1F601	😁	grinning face with smiling eyes
1F602	😂	face with tears of joy
1F603	😃	smiling face with open mouth (cf. ☺)
1F604	😄	smiling face with open mouth and smiling eyes
1F605	😅	smiling face with open mouth and cold sweat
1F606	😆	smiling face with open mouth and tightly-closed eyes
1F607	😇	smiling face with halo
1F608	😈	smiling face with horns (cf. 👿 "imp")
1F609	😉	winking face
1F60A	😊	smiling face with smiling eyes
1F60B	😋	face savouring delicious food
1F60C	😌	relieved face
1F60D	😍	smiling face with heart-shaped eyes
1F60E	😎	smiling face with sunglasses
1F60F	😏	smirking face
1F610	😐	neutral face (also used for "west wind" 西 in some Mahjong annotation)
1F611	😑	expressionless face
1F612	😒	unamused face
1F613	😓	face with cold sweat
1F614	😔	pensive face
1F615	😕	confused face
1F616	😖	confounded face
1F617	😗	kissing face
1F618	😘	face throwing a kiss
1F619	😙	kissing face with smiling eyes
1F61A	😚	kissing face with closed eyes
1F61B	😛	face with stuck-out tongue
1F61C	😜	face with stuck-out tongue and winking eye
1F61D	😝	face with stuck-out tongue and tightly-closed eyes
1F61E	😞	disappointed face
1F61F	😟	worried face
1F620	😠	angry face
1F621	😡	pouting face
1F622	😢	crying face
1F623	😣	persevering face
1F624	😤	face with look of triumph
1F625	😥	disappointed but relieved face
1F626	😦	frowning face with open mouth
1F627	😧	anguished face
1F628	😨	fearful face
1F629	😩	weary face
1F62A	😪	sleepy face
1F62B	😫	tired face
1F62C	😬	grimacing face
1F62D	😭	loudly crying face
1F62E	😮	face with open mouth
1F62F	😯	hushed face
1F630	😰	face with open mouth and cold sweat
1F631	😱	face screaming in fear
1F632	😲	astonished face
1F633	😳	flushed face
1F634	😴	sleeping face
1F635	😵	dizzy face
1F636	😶	face without mouth (cf. ⚇ "white circle with two dots")
1F637	😷	face with medical mask
1F638	😸	grinning cat face with smiling eyes
1F639	😹	cat face with tears of joy
1F63A	😺	smiling cat face with open mouth
1F63B	😻	smiling cat face with heart-shaped eyes
1F63C	😼	cat face with wry smile
1F63D	😽	kissing cat face with closed eyes
1F63E	😾	pouting cat face
1F63F	😿	crying cat face
1F640	🙀	weary cat face
1F641	🙁	slightly frowning face
1F642	🙂	slightly smiling face
1F643	🙃	upside-down face
1F644	🙄	face with rolling eyes
1F645	🙅	face with "no good" gesture, with lower arms crossed, derived from the Japanese "batsu" two-handed gesture for "no" or "wrong".
1F646	🙆	face with "ok" gesture, described as a person with arms raised above the head forming a "circle", derived from the Japanese "maru" two-handed gesture for "ok" or "correct".
1F647	🙇	person bowing deeply (dogeza).
1F648	🙈	see-no-evil monkey
1F649	🙉	hear-no-evil monkey
1F64A	🙊	speak-no-evil monkey
1F64B	🙋	happy person raising one hand, a person raising one hand as if to answer a question.
1F64C	🙌	person raising both hands in celebration, on many platforms depicted as just the raised hands (Apple name: "Hands Raised in Celebration").
1F64D	🙍	person frowning
1F64E	🙎	person with pouting face
1F64F	🙏	person with folded hands (to indicate variously sorrow, regret, pleading, praying, bowing, thanking). In most platforms depicted as just the hand, pressed together but not folded (Apple name: "Hands Pressed Together").

== Chart ==
Emoticons^{[1]} Official Unicode Consortium code chart (PDF)
	0	1	2	3	4	5	6	7	8	9	A	B	C	D	E	F
U+1F60x	😀	😁	😂	😃	😄	😅	😆	😇	😈	😉	😊	😋	😌	😍	😎	😏
U+1F61x	😐	😑	😒	😓	😔	😕	😖	😗	😘	😙	😚	😛	😜	😝	😞	😟
U+1F62x	😠	😡	😢	😣	😤	😥	😦	😧	😨	😩	😪	😫	😬	😭	😮	😯
U+1F63x	😰	😱	😲	😳	😴	😵	😶	😷	😸	😹	😺	😻	😼	😽	😾	😿
U+1F64x	🙀	🙁	🙂	🙃	🙄	🙅	🙆	🙇	🙈	🙉	🙊	🙋	🙌	🙍	🙎	🙏
Notes: 1. As of Unicode version 17.0

== Variant forms ==
Each emoticon has two variants:

- U+FE0E (VARIATION SELECTOR-15) selects text presentation (e.g. 😊︎ 😐︎ ☹︎),
- U+FE0F (VARIATION SELECTOR-16) selects emoji-style (e.g. 😊️ 😐️ ☹️).

If there is no variation selector appended, the default is the emoji-style. Example:

Unicode code points	Result
U+1F610 (NEUTRAL FACE)	😐
U+1F610 (NEUTRAL FACE), U+FE0E (VARIATION SELECTOR-15)	😐︎
U+1F610 (NEUTRAL FACE), U+FE0F (VARIATION SELECTOR-16)	😐️

== Emoji modifiers ==
The Miscellaneous Symbols and Pictographs block has 54 emoji that represent people or body parts. A set of "Emoji modifiers" are defined for emojis that represent people or body parts. These are modifier characters intended to define the skin colour to be used for the emoji. The draft document suggesting the introduction of this system for the representation of "human diversity" was submitted in 2015 by Mark Davis of Google and Peter Edberg of Apple Inc. Five symbol modifier characters were added with Unicode 8.0 to provide a range of skin tones for human emoji. These modifiers are called EMOJI MODIFIER FITZPATRICK TYPE-1-2, -3, -4, -5, and -6 (U+1F3FB–U+1F3FF): 🏻 🏼 🏽 🏾 🏿. They are based on the Fitzpatrick scale for classifying human skin color.

Human emoji
U+	1F645	1F646	1F647	1F64B	1F64C	1F64D	1F64E	1F64F
emoji	🙅	🙆	🙇	🙋	🙌	🙍	🙎	🙏
FITZ-1-2	🙅🏻	🙆🏻	🙇🏻	🙋🏻	🙌🏻	🙍🏻	🙎🏻	🙏🏻
FITZ-3	🙅🏼	🙆🏼	🙇🏼	🙋🏼	🙌🏼	🙍🏼	🙎🏼	🙏🏼
FITZ-4	🙅🏽	🙆🏽	🙇🏽	🙋🏽	🙌🏽	🙍🏽	🙎🏽	🙏🏽
FITZ-5	🙅🏾	🙆🏾	🙇🏾	🙋🏾	🙌🏾	🙍🏾	🙎🏾	🙏🏾
FITZ-6	🙅🏿	🙆🏿	🙇🏿	🙋🏿	🙌🏿	🙍🏿	🙎🏿	🙏🏿

Additional human emoji can be found in other Unicode blocks: Dingbats, Miscellaneous Symbols, Miscellaneous Symbols and Pictographs, Supplemental Symbols and Pictographs, Symbols and Pictographs Extended-A and Transport and Map Symbols.

== History ==
The following Unicode-related documents record the purpose and process of defining specific characters in the Emoticons block:

Version	Final code points (Note: Proposed code points and characters names may differ from final code points and names)	Count	L2 ID	WG2 ID	Document
6.0	U+1F601..1F610, 1F612..1F614, 1F616, 1F618, 1F61A, 1F61C..1F61E, 1F620..1F625, 1F628..1F62B, 1F62D, 1F630..1F633, 1F635..1F640, 1F645..1F64F (Note: Refer to the history section of the Miscellaneous Symbols and Pictographs block for additional emoji-related documents)	63	L2/09-007		Lommel, Arle (2008-12-26), Comparison of Emoticons from Major Vendors
6.0	U+1F601..1F610, 1F612..1F614, 1F616, 1F618, 1F61A, 1F61C..1F61E, 1F620..1F625, 1F628..1F62B, 1F62D, 1F630..1F633, 1F635..1F640, 1F645..1F64F	63	L2/09-025R2	N3582 (Note: Japanese translation of N3582 is available as N3621)	Scherer, Markus; Davis, Mark; Momoi, Kat; Tong, Darick; Kida, Yasuo; Edberg, Peter (2009-03-05), Proposal for Encoding Emoji Symbols
6.0	U+1F601..1F610, 1F612..1F614, 1F616, 1F618, 1F61A, 1F61C..1F61E, 1F620..1F625, 1F628..1F62B, 1F62D, 1F630..1F633, 1F635..1F640, 1F645..1F64F	63	L2/09-026R	N3583	Scherer, Markus; Davis, Mark; Momoi, Kat; Tong, Darick; Kida, Yasuo; Edberg, Peter (2009-02-06), Emoji Symbols Proposed for New Encoding
6.0	U+1F601..1F610, 1F612..1F614, 1F616, 1F618, 1F61A, 1F61C..1F61E, 1F620..1F625, 1F628..1F62B, 1F62D, 1F630..1F633, 1F635..1F640, 1F645..1F64F	63	L2/09-027R2	N3681	Scherer, Markus (2009-09-17), Emoji Symbols: Background Data
6.0	U+1F601..1F610, 1F612..1F614, 1F616, 1F618, 1F61A, 1F61C..1F61E, 1F620..1F625, 1F628..1F62B, 1F62D, 1F630..1F633, 1F635..1F640, 1F645..1F64F	63	L2/09-114	N3607	Towards an encoding of symbol characters used as emoji, 2009-04-06
6.0	U+1F601..1F610, 1F612..1F614, 1F616, 1F618, 1F61A, 1F61C..1F61E, 1F620..1F625, 1F628..1F62B, 1F62D, 1F630..1F633, 1F635..1F640, 1F645..1F64F	63	L2/09-304		Anderson, Deborah (2009-08-15), US Position on PDAM 8
6.0	U+1F601..1F610, 1F612..1F614, 1F616, 1F618, 1F61A, 1F61C..1F61E, 1F620..1F625, 1F628..1F62B, 1F62D, 1F630..1F633, 1F635..1F640, 1F645..1F64F	63	L2/09-370	N3711	Ogata, Katsuhiro; et al. (2009-10-22), A Proposal to Revise a Part of Emoticons in PDAM 8
6.0	U+1F601..1F610, 1F612..1F614, 1F616, 1F618, 1F61A, 1F61C..1F61E, 1F620..1F625, 1F628..1F62B, 1F62D, 1F630..1F633, 1F635..1F640, 1F645..1F64F	63	L2/09-371	N3713	Pentzlin, Karl (2009-10-22), Comment on "A proposal to Revise a Part of Emoticons in PDAM 8" (Katsuhiro Ogata et al., N3711)
6.0	U+1F601..1F610, 1F612..1F614, 1F616, 1F618, 1F61A, 1F61C..1F61E, 1F620..1F625, 1F628..1F62B, 1F62D, 1F630..1F633, 1F635..1F640, 1F645..1F64F	63	L2/09-412	N3722	Suignard, Michel (2009-10-26), Disposition of comments on SC2 N 4078 (PDAM text for Amendment 8 to ISO/IEC 10646:2003)
6.0	U+1F601..1F610, 1F612..1F614, 1F616, 1F618, 1F61A, 1F61C..1F61E, 1F620..1F625, 1F628..1F62B, 1F62D, 1F630..1F633, 1F635..1F640, 1F645..1F64F	63		N3703 (pdf, doc)	Umamaheswaran, V. S. (2010-04-13), "M55.9j", Unconfirmed minutes of WG 2 meeting no. 55, Tokyo 2009-10-26/30
6.0	U+1F601..1F610, 1F612..1F614, 1F616, 1F618, 1F61A, 1F61C..1F61E, 1F620..1F625, 1F628..1F62B, 1F62D, 1F630..1F633, 1F635..1F640, 1F645..1F64F	63	L2/09-335R		Moore, Lisa (2009-11-10), "Consensus 121-C8", UTC #121 / L2 #218 Minutes
6.0	U+1F601..1F610, 1F612..1F614, 1F616, 1F618, 1F61A, 1F61C..1F61E, 1F620..1F625, 1F628..1F62B, 1F62D, 1F630..1F633, 1F635..1F640, 1F645..1F64F	63	L2/10-036	N3769	Pentzlin, Karl (2010-01-26), Proposal to encode an emoticon Neutral Face
6.0	U+1F601..1F610, 1F612..1F614, 1F616, 1F618, 1F61A, 1F61C..1F61E, 1F620..1F625, 1F628..1F62B, 1F62D, 1F630..1F633, 1F635..1F640, 1F645..1F64F	63	L2/10-061R		Scherer, Markus; et al. (2010-02-04), "2, 4", Emoji: Review of FPDAM8
6.0	U+1F601..1F610, 1F612..1F614, 1F616, 1F618, 1F61A, 1F61C..1F61E, 1F620..1F625, 1F628..1F62B, 1F62D, 1F630..1F633, 1F635..1F640, 1F645..1F64F	63	L2/10-066	N3790-ANSI	Anderson, Deborah (2010-02-05), ANSI (U.S.) NB Comments on FPDAM 8
6.0	U+1F601..1F610, 1F612..1F614, 1F616, 1F618, 1F61A, 1F61C..1F61E, 1F620..1F625, 1F628..1F62B, 1F62D, 1F630..1F633, 1F635..1F640, 1F645..1F64F	63	L2/10-015R		Moore, Lisa (2010-02-09), "D.1.3", UTC #122 / L2 #219 Minutes
6.0	U+1F601..1F610, 1F612..1F614, 1F616, 1F618, 1F61A, 1F61C..1F61E, 1F620..1F625, 1F628..1F62B, 1F62D, 1F630..1F633, 1F635..1F640, 1F645..1F64F	63		N3778	Ogata, Katsuhiro; Kamichi, Koichi; Moro, Shigeki; Kawabata, Taichi; Naoi, Yasushi (2010-03-03), Updated Proposal to Change Some Glyphs and Names of Emoticons
6.0	U+1F601..1F610, 1F612..1F614, 1F616, 1F618, 1F61A, 1F61C..1F61E, 1F620..1F625, 1F628..1F62B, 1F62D, 1F630..1F633, 1F635..1F640, 1F645..1F64F	63	L2/10-089	N3777	KDDI Input on Emoji, 2010-03-08
6.0	U+1F601..1F610, 1F612..1F614, 1F616, 1F618, 1F61A, 1F61C..1F61E, 1F620..1F625, 1F628..1F62B, 1F62D, 1F630..1F633, 1F635..1F640, 1F645..1F64F	63	L2/10-102	N3790	Summary of Voting on SC 2 N 4123, ISO/IEC 10646: 2003/FPDAM 8, 2010-03-27
6.0	U+1F601..1F610, 1F612..1F614, 1F616, 1F618, 1F61A, 1F61C..1F61E, 1F620..1F625, 1F628..1F62B, 1F62D, 1F630..1F633, 1F635..1F640, 1F645..1F64F	63	L2/10-115	N3806	Ogata, Katsuhiro; Kamichi, Koichi; Moro, Shigeki; Kawabata, Taichi; Naoi, Yasushi (2010-04-06), Rationale for Proposal of N3778
6.0	U+1F601..1F610, 1F612..1F614, 1F616, 1F618, 1F61A, 1F61C..1F61E, 1F620..1F625, 1F628..1F62B, 1F62D, 1F630..1F633, 1F635..1F640, 1F645..1F64F	63	L2/10-135	N3826	Everson, Michael (2010-04-22), Emoticons for FDIS 8
6.0	U+1F601..1F610, 1F612..1F614, 1F616, 1F618, 1F61A, 1F61C..1F61E, 1F620..1F625, 1F628..1F62B, 1F62D, 1F630..1F633, 1F635..1F640, 1F645..1F64F	63	L2/10-137	N3828	Suignard, Michel (2010-04-22), Disposition of comments on SC2 N 4123 (FPDAM text for Amendment 8 to ISO/IEC 10646:2003)
6.0	U+1F601..1F610, 1F612..1F614, 1F616, 1F618, 1F61A, 1F61C..1F61E, 1F620..1F625, 1F628..1F62B, 1F62D, 1F630..1F633, 1F635..1F640, 1F645..1F64F	63	L2/10-132		Scherer, Markus; Davis, Mark; Momoi, Kat; Tong, Darick; Kida, Yasuo; Edberg, Peter (2010-04-27), Emoji Symbols: Background Data
6.0	U+1F601..1F610, 1F612..1F614, 1F616, 1F618, 1F61A, 1F61C..1F61E, 1F620..1F625, 1F628..1F62B, 1F62D, 1F630..1F633, 1F635..1F640, 1F645..1F64F	63	L2/10-138	N3829	Constable, Peter; et al. (2010-04-27), Emoji Ad-Hoc Meeting Report
6.0	U+1F601..1F610, 1F612..1F614, 1F616, 1F618, 1F61A, 1F61C..1F61E, 1F620..1F625, 1F628..1F62B, 1F62D, 1F630..1F633, 1F635..1F640, 1F645..1F64F	63	L2/10-108		Moore, Lisa (2010-05-19), "Consensus 123-C3", UTC #123 / L2 #220 Minutes
6.0	U+1F601..1F610, 1F612..1F614, 1F616, 1F618, 1F61A, 1F61C..1F61E, 1F620..1F625, 1F628..1F62B, 1F62D, 1F630..1F633, 1F635..1F640, 1F645..1F64F	63		N3803 (pdf, doc)	"M56.01", Unconfirmed minutes of WG 2 meeting no. 56, 2010-09-24
6.0	U+1F601..1F610, 1F612..1F614, 1F616, 1F618, 1F61A, 1F61C..1F61E, 1F620..1F625, 1F628..1F62B, 1F62D, 1F630..1F633, 1F635..1F640, 1F645..1F64F	63	L2/15-015R2		Davis, Mark; et al. (2015-01-21), Recommended Unicode Glyph / Nameslist changes
6.0	U+1F601..1F610, 1F612..1F614, 1F616, 1F618, 1F61A, 1F61C..1F61E, 1F620..1F625, 1F628..1F62B, 1F62D, 1F630..1F633, 1F635..1F640, 1F645..1F64F	63	L2/15-071R		Davis, Mark; Burge, Jeremy (2015-02-03), More Unicode Emoji Glyph changes
6.0	U+1F601..1F610, 1F612..1F614, 1F616, 1F618, 1F61A, 1F61C..1F61E, 1F620..1F625, 1F628..1F62B, 1F62D, 1F630..1F633, 1F635..1F640, 1F645..1F64F	63	L2/15-141 (pdf, html)		Davis, Mark; Edberg, Peter (2015-03-31), Emoji Glyph and Annotation Recommendations
6.0	U+1F601..1F610, 1F612..1F614, 1F616, 1F618, 1F61A, 1F61C..1F61E, 1F620..1F625, 1F628..1F62B, 1F62D, 1F630..1F633, 1F635..1F640, 1F645..1F64F	63	L2/15-107		Moore, Lisa (2015-05-12), "Consensus 143-C20", UTC #143 Minutes, "Update chart glyphs and annotations based on L2/15-151 for Unicode 8.0."
6.0	U+1F601..1F610, 1F612..1F614, 1F616, 1F618, 1F61A, 1F61C..1F61E, 1F620..1F625, 1F628..1F62B, 1F62D, 1F630..1F633, 1F635..1F640, 1F645..1F64F	63	L2/15-199		Proposed annotation additions for Unicode 9.0, 2015-07-31
6.0	U+1F601..1F610, 1F612..1F614, 1F616, 1F618, 1F61A, 1F61C..1F61E, 1F620..1F625, 1F628..1F62B, 1F62D, 1F630..1F633, 1F635..1F640, 1F645..1F64F	63	L2/16-281		Burge, Jeremy; Hunt, Paul (2016-10-17), Emoji Glyph Updates
6.0	U+1F601..1F610, 1F612..1F614, 1F616, 1F618, 1F61A, 1F61C..1F61E, 1F620..1F625, 1F628..1F62B, 1F62D, 1F630..1F633, 1F635..1F640, 1F645..1F64F	63	L2/16-361		Pournader, Roozbeh; Felt, Doug (2016-11-07), Add text and emoji standardized variation sequences for 96 symbols
6.1	U+1F600, 1F611, 1F615, 1F617, 1F619, 1F61B, 1F61F, 1F626..1F627, 1F62C, 1F62E..1F62F, 1F634	13	L2/09-007		Lommel, Arle (2008-12-26), Comparison of Emoticons from Major Vendors
6.1	U+1F600, 1F611, 1F615, 1F617, 1F619, 1F61B, 1F61F, 1F626..1F627, 1F62C, 1F62E..1F62F, 1F634	13	L2/09-025R2	N3582	Scherer, Markus; Davis, Mark; Momoi, Kat; Tong, Darick; Kida, Yasuo; Edberg, Peter (2009-03-05), Proposal for Encoding Emoji Symbols
6.1	U+1F600, 1F611, 1F615, 1F617, 1F619, 1F61B, 1F61F, 1F626..1F627, 1F62C, 1F62E..1F62F, 1F634	13	L2/09-026R	N3583	Scherer, Markus; Davis, Mark; Momoi, Kat; Tong, Darick; Kida, Yasuo; Edberg, Peter (2009-02-06), Emoji Symbols Proposed for New Encoding
6.1	U+1F600, 1F611, 1F615, 1F617, 1F619, 1F61B, 1F61F, 1F626..1F627, 1F62C, 1F62E..1F62F, 1F634	13	L2/09-027R2	N3681	Scherer, Markus (2009-09-17), Emoji Symbols: Background Data
6.1	U+1F600, 1F611, 1F615, 1F617, 1F619, 1F61B, 1F61F, 1F626..1F627, 1F62C, 1F62E..1F62F, 1F634	13	L2/10-102	N3790	Summary of Voting on SC 2 N 4123, ISO/IEC 10646: 2003/FPDAM 8, 2010-03-27
6.1	U+1F600, 1F611, 1F615, 1F617, 1F619, 1F61B, 1F61F, 1F626..1F627, 1F62C, 1F62E..1F62F, 1F634	13	L2/10-132		Scherer, Markus; Davis, Mark; Momoi, Kat; Tong, Darick; Kida, Yasuo; Edberg, Peter (2010-04-27), Emoji Symbols: Background Data
6.1	U+1F600, 1F611, 1F615, 1F617, 1F619, 1F61B, 1F61F, 1F626..1F627, 1F62C, 1F62E..1F62F, 1F634	13	L2/10-138	N3829	Constable, Peter; et al. (2010-04-27), "7", Emoji Ad-Hoc Meeting Report
6.1	U+1F600, 1F611, 1F615, 1F617, 1F619, 1F61B, 1F61F, 1F626..1F627, 1F62C, 1F62E..1F62F, 1F634	13		N3803 (pdf, doc)	"M56.01", Unconfirmed minutes of WG 2 meeting no. 56, 2010-09-24
6.1	U+1F600, 1F611, 1F615, 1F617, 1F619, 1F61B, 1F61F, 1F626..1F627, 1F62C, 1F62E..1F62F, 1F634	13	L2/15-015R2		Davis, Mark; et al. (2015-01-21), Recommended Unicode Glyph / Nameslist changes
6.1	U+1F600, 1F611, 1F615, 1F617, 1F619, 1F61B, 1F61F, 1F626..1F627, 1F62C, 1F62E..1F62F, 1F634	13	L2/15-071R		Davis, Mark; Burge, Jeremy (2015-02-03), More Unicode Emoji Glyph changes
6.1	U+1F600, 1F611, 1F615, 1F617, 1F619, 1F61B, 1F61F, 1F626..1F627, 1F62C, 1F62E..1F62F, 1F634	13	L2/15-141 (pdf, html)		Davis, Mark; Edberg, Peter (2015-03-31), Emoji Glyph and Annotation Recommendations
6.1	U+1F600, 1F611, 1F615, 1F617, 1F619, 1F61B, 1F61F, 1F626..1F627, 1F62C, 1F62E..1F62F, 1F634	13	L2/15-107		Moore, Lisa (2015-05-12), "Consensus 143-C20", UTC #143 Minutes, "Update chart glyphs and annotations based on L2/15-151 for Unicode 8.0."
7.0	U+1F641..1F642	2	L2/10-429		Pentzlin, Karl (2010-10-22), Proposal to encode three additional emoticons
7.0	U+1F641..1F642	2	L2/11-037	N3982	Proposal to encode three additional emoticons, 2011-01-03
7.0	U+1F641..1F642	2	L2/11-253		Whistler, Ken (2011-06-16), "I", WG2 consent docket
7.0	U+1F641..1F642	2		N4103	"11.6 Three additional emoticons", Unconfirmed minutes of WG 2 meeting 58, 2012-01-03
7.0	U+1F641..1F642	2	L2/23-034		Gawne, Lauren; Daniel, Jennifer (2022-12-16), Head Shaking Horizontally Unicode Emoji Proposal [Affects U+1F642]
7.0	U+1F641..1F642	2	L2/23-035		Gawne, Lauren; Daniel, Jennifer (2022-12-16), Head Shaking Vertically Unicode Emoji Proposal [Affects U+1F642]
7.0	U+1F641..1F642	2	L2/23-037R		Daniel, Jennifer (2023-01-25), Recommendations for ZWJ Sequences, Unicode 15.1 [Affects U+1F642]
7.0	U+1F641..1F642	2	L2/23-005		Constable, Peter (2023-02-01), "G.1.1 Emoji 15.1 Recommendations", UTC #174 Minutes
8.0	U+1F643..1F644	2	L2/14-174R		Davis, Mark; Edberg, Peter (2014-08-27), Emoji Additions
8.0	U+1F643..1F644	2	L2/14-172R		Davis, Mark; Edberg, Peter (2014-08-29), Proposed enhancements for emoji characters: background
8.0	U+1F643..1F644	2	L2/14-275		Edberg, Peter; et al. (2014-10-23), Emoji ad-hoc committee recommendations to UTC #141
8.0	U+1F643..1F644	2	L2/14-284R2		Edberg, Peter; Davis, Mark (2014-10-28), Emoji-System Compatibility Additions
8.0	U+1F643..1F644	2	L2/15-025	N4654	Anderson, Deborah (2014-10-30), Future Additions to ISO/IEC 10646
8.0	U+1F643..1F644	2	L2/15-030		Davis, Mark (2015-01-29), Emojipedia top requests

== See also ==
- Some basic smiley faces (☹, ☺, ☻) are in Miscellaneous Symbols block
- Some body parts (e.g. ✌️; ⛹; etc) are in the Miscellaneous Symbols and Dingbat blocks
- Some heads and figures (e.g. 👦; 🛀; etc) are in Miscellaneous Symbols and Pictographs and Transport and Map Symbols blocks
- Additional smiley faces (e.g. 🤐, 🤑, etc) are in Supplemental Symbols and Pictographs block
