= Hannahowo =

American influencer (born 2002)

- Born: November 21, 2002 (age 23)
- Education: London College of Fashion
- Occupations: Internet celebrity, streamer
- Years active: 2018–present

Hannah Kabel known professionally as Hannahowo is an American influencer, streamer, and OnlyFans model.

She gained popularity on TikTok in the early 2020-s as part of the "e-girl" subculture.

== Biography ==
Born on November 21, 2002, in the US. Kabel attended a private school, then earned a bachelor's degree in fashion and business management from the London College of Fashion. After that, she worked as a certified nursing assistant in university hospitals while developing her career online. From an early age, she was fond of singing and began performing gospel music, but did not achieve fame through it. Ever since she was a child, she has been interested in fashion, makeup, and online games.

Her pseudonym is derived from her real name, Hannah, and “Owo” is not a last name; it likely comes from the emoticon “uwu,” which conveys a cute or playful expression.

== Career ==
In December 2017, during a school trip to Norway, a friend took photos of her at the airport, after which she gained popularity. She later joined Instagram under the name “The Anorexic Model,” which led many to believe her claims of having anorexia. Her popularity increased significantly after she appeared on the show Baby Ariel X.

She began her career in 2018 by posting lip-sync and dance videos on TikTok. She quickly gained popularity through lip-sync videos, makeup tutorials, and humorous clips. Her first TikTok account was blocked for violating the age policy — at that time it had more than 4 million followers and over 50 million likes. According to some reports, the block occurred after her personal OnlyFans content was circulated on social media. Users on social media claimed that TikTok deleted the account over videos deemed unacceptable for the platform, citing explicit footage. No video or screenshot was found to support this claim.

== Personal life ==
Despite her fame, she prefers to keep her personal life private: it is unknown who her parents are or what her partner's name is.

=== Position ===
In 2020, she showed her support for the “Black Lives Matter” movement by adding a hashtag related to the topic to her Instagram profile.

== Online influence ==
Hannah has had an influence on American meme culture: clips from her streams went viral, and she appeared in numerous "bait-and-switch" internet memes. One of her clips from a Twitch stream, in which she voices the emoticon "uwu" was uploaded to YouTube in August 2021 and went viral in early 2022. This phrase became a viral “insider” meme and spread around the world in gaming and meme communities. She is also known for her “Ahegao” style photographs.
