= . . =

._. may refer to:

- (._.), an emoticon representing sadness or boredom
- The letter R in Morse code
