= Młodzieżowe Słowo Roku =

Polish language poll

Youth Word of the Year (Polish: Młodzieżowe Słowo Roku) is an annual poll organized by Polish Scientific Publishers PWN (Wydawnictwo Naukowe PWN) since 2016. Its aim is to select the most popular words, expressions and phrases among young people in a given year.

The contest is not necessarily won by the proposal that has been submitted by the largest number of participants. The winners in this poll are selected by a jury, evaluating the originality, creativity and linguistic correctness of the submitted proposals. According to the rules, eliminated from the competition are words, which after an analysis by the jury, were considered vulgar, offensive, containing illegal content, inciting intolerance/violence, hate speech or violating good manners. Also eliminated from the competition are words that have already been awarded in previous editions.

The youth word of 2016 was sztos, a word that means "something cool, amazing, fantastic".

In 2017, xD won, although sztos and dwudzionek were submitted more times. The former, however, could not become the youth word of the year because it had already won in 2016, and dwudzionek dropped out because the PWN committee considered it a "poorly accepted purist idea" to replace the word weekend. In addition, the word idea smartwica/smartfica, the neologism odjaniepawlić/odjaniepawlać and pocisk along with the related verb pocisnąć kogoś, were singled out.

In 2018, the word of the year was dzban. The words masny and prestiż were also honoured. In the category of "interestingly constructed word", the words zwyklak and mamadżer were selected.

In 2019, the plebiscite was won by the word alternatywka and on the podium were also the words jesieniara and eluwina, at the same time it was decided to disqualify the most frequently reported word p0lka.

In 2020, the plebiscite was not decided. The jury found the most frequently submitted words to be "vulgar, mocking specific people, views, attitudes or gender". Despite the lack of adjudication, the jury decided to honour the neologism tozależyzm.

== Results ==
Year	1st place	2nd place	3rd place
2016	sztos	ogarnąć/ogarniać się	beka/masakra (Note: ex aequo)
2017	xD	sztos	dwudzionek
2018	dzban	masny/masno	prestiż/prestiżowy
2019	alternatywka	jesieniara	eluwina
2020	Contest not resolved - honourable mention of the word tozależyzm		
2021	śpiulkolot	naura	twoja stara
2022	essa	slay,łymyn	betoniarz, NPC
2023	rel	sigma	oporowo
2024	sigma	azbest	czemó
2025	szpont/szponcić	67	OKPA

== Jury ==
The jury consists of:

- Prof. Dr. Marek Lazinski,
- Prof. Dr. Ewa Kołodziejek,
- Prof. Dr. Anna Wileczek,
- Bartek Chaciński.
