= -.- =

-.- may refer to:

- (-.-), an emoticon representing shame
- The letter K in Morse code
