= ^^ =

^^ may refer to:

- A kaomoji
- Tetration, the ASCII form of the tetration operator ↑↑
- Record separator, control character in the caret notation
- Logical exclusive or, operator in the GLSL language
- In Command Prompt, when not in quotes, represents a single ^ character, as in one^^two.txt
- The reflection operator in C++, colloquially known as the "cat-ears operator"
