= Eyeglasses emoji =

Eyeglasses emoji may refer to:

- U+1F453 👓 EYEGLASSES in the Unicode block Miscellaneous Symbols and Pictographs
- 8-) and similar ASCII emoticons; see List of emoticons
