= (= =

The (= text sign may refer to:

- (= (emoticon), a commonly used marker for a smiling face
- (= (currency), a textual representation of the Euro currency in DR-DOS 7.02 (COUNTRY.SYS) in 1998

== See also ==
- C=, a similar looking digraph often used as textual transcription for the Commodore company logo
