= B) =

B) may refer to:

- Emoticon
- Blu-ray
