= Emoticon =

Pictorial representation of a facial expression

An emoticon portraying a smiling face

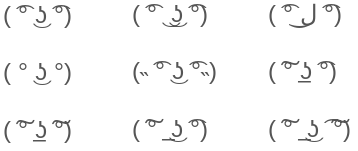
Examples of kaomoji smileys

An emoticon (/əˈmoʊtəkɒn/, ə-MOH-tə-kon, rarely /ɪˈmɒtɪkɒn/, ih-MOTT-ih-kon; portmanteau of emotion and icon) is a pictorial representation of a facial expression using characters—usually punctuation marks, numbers and letters—to express a person's feelings, mood or reaction, without needing to describe it in detail.

Typographical emoticons can be traced back hundreds of years with various one-off uses. The protocol as a way to use them to communicate emotion in ASCII conversations is credited to computer scientist Scott Fahlman, who proposed what came to be known as "smileys"—:-) and :-(—in a message on the bulletin board system (BBS) of Carnegie Mellon University in 1982. In Western countries, emoticons are usually written at a right angle to the direction of the text. Users from Japan popularized a kind of emoticon called kaomoji, using Japanese's larger character sets. This style arose on ASCII NET of Japan in 1986. They are also known as verticons (from vertical emoticon) due to their readability without rotations. This is often seen as the 1st generation of emoticons.

The second generation began when computing became more common in the west, and people began replacing the previous ASCII art with actual emoticon icons or designs. One term used to define these types of emoticons compared to ASCII was portrait emoticons, as portrait emoticons are meant to resemble a face from the front like a portrait painting. The use of these emoticons became prevalent when SMS mobile text messaging and the Internet became widespread in the late 1990s, emoticons became increasingly popular and were commonly used in texting, Internet forums and emails. Over time, the designs became more elaborate and emoticons such as 🙂 by Unicode became commonly referred to as Emoticons. They have played a significant role in communication as technology for communication purposes advanced and increased in use. Emoticons today convey non-verbal cues of language, such as facial expressions but also hand gestures, with The Smiley Company stating in interviews that emoticons now allow for greater emotional understanding in writing when emoticons are used. Emoticons were the precursors to modern emojis not just for facial expressions, but also replacing categories like weather, sports and animals.

== History ==
=== Background ===
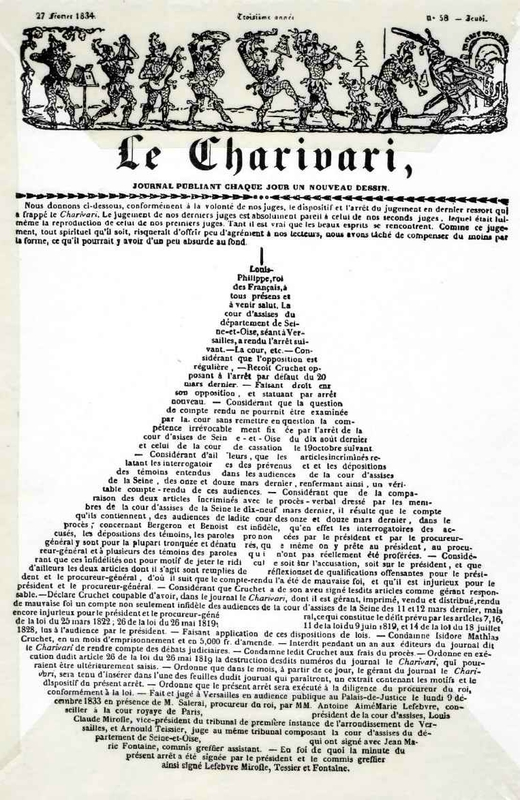
Cover of the French magazine Le Charivari, text of a legal ruling against the magazine in the shape of a pear, 1834

The use of typographic symbols to represent facial expression can be observed as early as Purgatorio, where Dante Alighieri employs the word "omo" as a preemoticon representation of the human face. The two letters "o" signify sunken eyes, while the letter "m" forms the angular outlines of the eyelids, nose, and cheeks, depicting an emaciated face marked by hunger and thirst.

Their sockets were like rings without the gems;
Whoever in the face of men reads 'omo'
Might well in these have recognised the 'm.'

— Purgatorio XXIII. 31-33

In 1648, poet Robert Herrick wrote, "Tumble me down, and I will sit Upon my ruins, (smiling yet:)." Herrick's work predated any other recorded use of brackets as a smiling face by around 200 years. However, experts doubted the inclusion of the colon in the poem was deliberate and if it was meant to represent a smiling face. English professor Alan Jacobs argued that "punctuation, in general, was unsettled in the seventeenth century ... Herrick was unlikely to have consistent punctuational practices himself, and even if he did he couldn't expect either his printers or his readers to share them." 17th century typography practice often placed colons and semicolons within parentheses, including 14 instances of ":)" in Richard Baxter's 1653 Plain Scripture Proof of Infants Church-membership and Baptism.

=== Text-based art and faces since telegraphy ===
Precursors to modern emoticons have existed since the 19th century. The National Telegraphic Review and Operators Guide in April 1857 documented the use of the number 73 in Morse code (--... ...--) to express "love and kisses" (later reduced to the more formal "best regards"). Dodge's Manual in 1908 documented the reintroduction of "love and kisses" as the number 88 (---.. ---..). New Zealand academics Joan Gajadhar and John Green comment that both Morse code abbreviations are more succinct than modern abbreviations such as LOL.

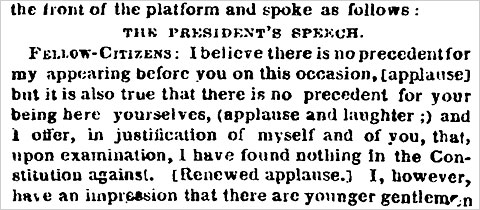
Transcript of Abraham Lincoln's speech in 1862

The transcript of one of Abraham Lincoln's speeches in 1862 recorded the audience's reaction as: "(applause and laughter ;)". There has been some debate whether the glyph in Lincoln's speech was a typo, a legitimate punctuation construct or the first emoticon. Linguist Philip Seargeant argues that it was a simple typesetting error.

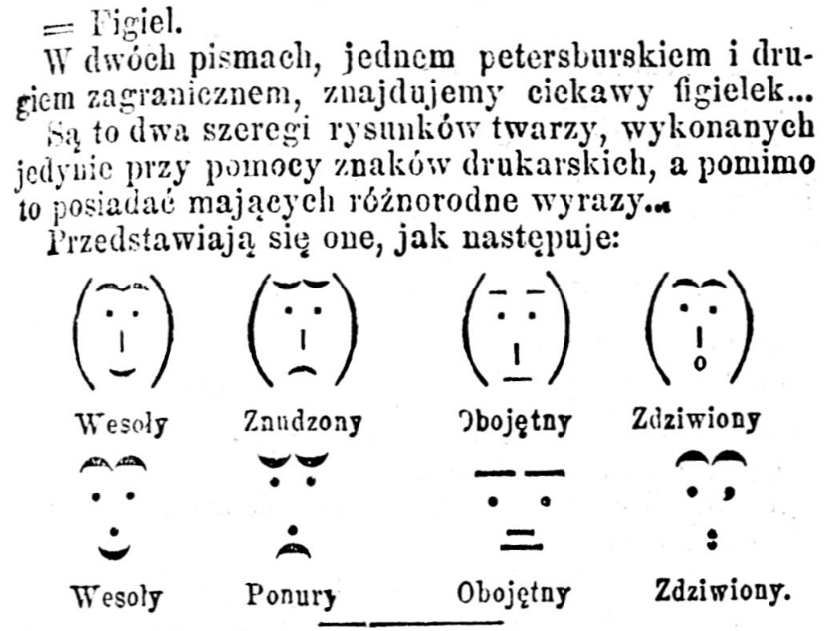
"Typographical art" published in the March 5, 1881, issue of Kurjer Warszawski

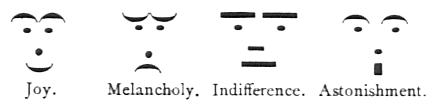
Emoticons in the satirical magazine Puck on March 30, 1881

Before March 1881, the examples of "typographical art" appeared in at least three newspaper articles, including Kurjer warszawski (published in Warsaw) from March 5, 1881, using punctuation to represent the emotions of joy, melancholy, indifference and astonishment.

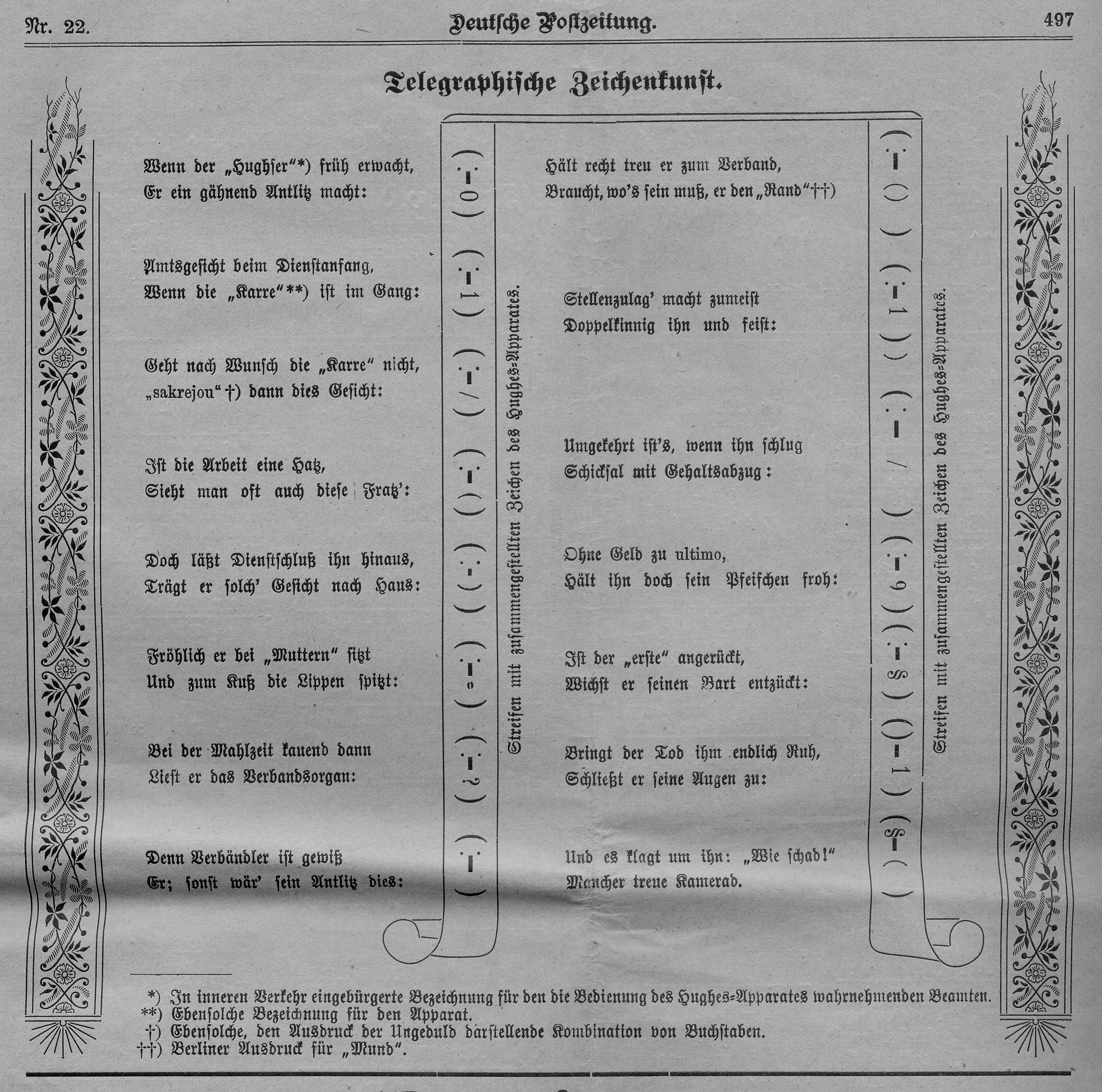
Telegraphische Zeichenkunst in the German Deutsche Postzeitung, November 16, 1896

In a 1912 essay titled "For Brevity and Clarity", American author Ambrose Bierce suggested facetiously that a bracket could be used to represent a smiling face, proposing "an improvement in punctuation" with which writers could convey cachinnation, loud or immoderate laughter: "it is written thus ‿ and presents a smiling mouth. It is to be appended, with the full stop, to every jocular or ironical sentence". In a 1936 Harvard Lampoon article, writer Alan Gregg proposed combining brackets with various other punctuation marks to represent various moods. Brackets were used for the sides of the mouth or cheeks, with other punctuation used between the brackets to display various emotions: (-) for a smile, (--) (showing more "teeth") for laughter, (#) for a frown and (*) for a wink.

An instance of text characters representing a sideways smiling and frowning face could be found in the New York Herald Tribune on March 10, 1953, promoting the film Lili starring Leslie Caron.

The September 1962 issue of MAD magazine included an article titled "Typewri-toons". The piece, featuring typewriter-generated artwork credited to "Royal Portable", was entirely made up of repurposed typography, including a capital letter P having a bigger 'bust' than a capital I, a lowercase b and d discussing their pregnancies, an asterisk on top of a letter to indicate the letter had just come inside from snowfall, and a classroom of lowercase n's interrupted by a lowercase h "raising its hand". A further example attributed to a Baltimore Sunday Sun columnist appeared in a 1967 article in Reader's Digest, using a dash and right bracket to represent a tongue in one's cheek: —). Prefiguring the modern "smiley" emoticon, writer Vladimir Nabokov told an interviewer from The New York Times in 1969, "I often think there should exist a special typographical sign for a smile—some sort of concave mark, a supine round bracket, which I would now like to trace in reply to your question."

In the 1970s, the PLATO IV computer system was launched. It was one of the first computers used throughout educational and professional institutions, but rarely used in a residential setting. On the computer system, a student at the University of Illinois developed pictograms that resembled different smiling faces. Mary Kalantzis and Bill Cope stated this likely took place in 1972, and they claimed these to be the first emoticons.

=== ASCII emoticons - First generation (1982–mid-1990s) ===
In 1982, Carnegie Mellon computer scientist Scott Fahlman is generally credited with the protocol of communicating and portraying emotion in written text. The use of ASCII symbols, a standard set of codes representing typographical marks, was essential to allow the symbols to be displayed on any computer. In Carnegie Mellon's bulletin board system, Fahlman proposed colon–hyphen–right bracket :-) as a label for "attempted humor" to try to solve the difficulty of conveying humor or sarcasm in plain text. Fahlman sent the following message (Note: The transcript of the conversation between several computer scientists, including David Touretzky, Guy Steele and Jaime Carbonell, was believed lost before it was recovered 20 years later from old backup tapes.) after an incident where a humorous warning about a mercury spill in an elevator was misunderstood as serious:

19-Sep-82 11:44    Scott E  Fahlman             :-)
From: Scott E  Fahlman <Fahlman at Cmu-20c>
 
I propose that the following character sequence for joke markers:
        
:-)
        
Read it sideways.  Actually, it is probably more economical to mark
things that are NOT jokes, given current trends.  For this, use
        
:-(

Within a few months, the smiley had spread to the ARPANET and Usenet. Other suggestions on the forum included an asterisk * and an ampersand &, the latter meant to represent a person doubled over in laughter, as well as a percent sign % and a pound sign #. Scott Fahlman suggested that not only could his emoticon communicate emotion, but also replace language. Since the 1990s, emoticons (colon, hyphen and bracket) have become integral to digital communications, and have inspired a variety of other emoticons, including the "winking" face using a semicolon ;-), XD, a representation of the Face with Tears of Joy emoji and the acronym "LOL".

In 1996, The Smiley Company was established by Nicolas Loufrani and his father Franklin as a way of commercializing the smiley trademark. As part of this, The Smiley Dictionary website was launched and had a focus on ASCII emoticons, where available emoticons were catalogued. In total more than 500 were recorded. Notably this catalog removed the dash ( - ) for a nose and just had eyes and a mouth. The reasoning behind this was to make the ASCII emoticons more like the smiley, which resulted in :) instead of :-). The shortening or redesign of ASCII emoticons has not been covered in enough depth to know where the shorter versions originated, but The Smiley Dictionary could have as a minimum influenced the way ASCII emoticons are used today. Many other people did similar to Loufrani from 1995 onwards, including David Sanderson creating the book Smileys in 1997. James Marshall also hosted an online collection of ASCII emoticons that he completed in 2008. In 1998, the book Le Dico Smiley was also published.

A researcher at Stanford University surveyed the emoticons used in four million Twitter messages and found that the smiling emoticon without a hyphen "nose" :) was much more common than the original version with the hyphen :-). Linguist Vyvyan Evans argues that this represents a shift in usage by younger users as a form of covert prestige: rejecting a standard usage in order to demonstrate in-group membership.

=== Portrait emoticons - Second generation (1990s–present) ===
Nicolas Loufrani began to use the basic text designs and turned them into graphical representations, which are now known as portrait emoticons. His designs were registered at the United States Copyright Office in 1997 and appeared online as GIF files in 1998. For ASCII emoticons that did not exist to convert into graphical form, Loufrani also backward engineered new ASCII emoticons from the graphical versions he created. These were the first graphical representations of ASCII emoticons. Not only did these portrait emoticons portray existing and new ASCII emoticons, but also new features were added, such as hand gestures in the form of white gloves. These have since become standalone emojis along with other emojis that have replaced words in text communication. In 2001, he published his emoticon set online on the Smiley Dictionary. This dictionary included 640 different smiley icons and was published as a book called Dico Smileys in 2002. In 2017, British magazine The Drum referred to Loufrani as the "godfather of the emoji" for his work in the field.

The first American company to take notice of emojis was Google beginning in 2007. In August 2007, a team made up of Mark Davis and his colleagues Kat Momoi and Markus Scherer began petitioning the Unicode Technical Committee (UTC) in an attempt to standardise the emoji. The UTC, having previously deemed emoji to be out of scope for Unicode, made the decision to broaden its scope to enable compatibility with the Japanese cellular carrier formats which were becoming more widespread. Peter Edberg and Yasuo Kida joined the collaborative effort from Apple Inc. shortly after, and their official UTC proposal came in January 2009 with 625 new emoji characters. Notably the move included a large set of emoticons, designed in an emoji-style but representing different emotions.

In recent times, emoticons, emojis and smileys have often become intertwined and confused. Emojis represent the largest set of graphical communication, but they often include portrait emoticons. In fact, the majority of the most commonly used Emoji are emoticons (because they represent an emotion). In 2024, the BBC reported that 2 of the top 3 emojis were portrait emoticons.

On September 23, 2021, it was announced that Scott Fahlman was holding an auction for the original emoticons he created in 1982. The auction was held in Dallas, United States, and sold the two designs as non-fungible tokens (NFT). The online auction ended later that month, with the originals selling for US$237,500. A year later in 2022, The Smiley Company auctioned off an NFT of 42 original graphical emoticon on World Emoji Day. The proceeds of the sale went to the company's non-profit arm, Smiley Movement.

In some programming languages, certain operators are known informally by their emoticon-like appearance. This includes the Spaceship operator <=> (a comparison), the Diamond operator <> (for type hinting) and the Elvis operator ?: (a shortened ternary operator).

== Styles ==
=== Western ===
Usually, emoticons in Western style have the eyes on the left, followed by the nose and the mouth. It is commonly placed at the end of a sentence, replacing the full stop. The two-character version :), which omits the nose, is very popular. The most basic emoticons are relatively consistent in form, but some can be rotated (making them tiny ambigrams). There are also some variations to emoticons to get new definitions, like changing a character to express another feeling. For example, :( indicates sadness and :(( indicates a more extreme sadness. Weeping can be written as :'(. A blush can be expressed as :">. Others include wink ;), a grin :D, :P for tongue out, and smug :->; they can be used to denote a flirting or joking tone, or may be implying a second meaning in the sentence preceding it. ;P, such as when blowing a raspberry. An often used combination is also <3 for a heart and </3 for a broken heart. :O is also sometimes used to depict shock. :/ is used to depict melancholy, disappointment or disapproval. :| may be used to depict a neutral face.

A broad grin is sometimes shown with crinkled eyes to express further amusement; XD and the addition of further "D" letters can suggest laughter or extreme amusement, e.g., XDDDD. The "3" in X3 and :3 represents a cat's mouth. An equal sign is often used for the eyes in place of the colon, seen as =). It has become more acceptable to omit the hyphen, whether a colon or an equal sign is used for the eyes. One linguistic study has indicated that the use of a nose in an emoticon may be related to the user's age, with younger people less likely to use a nose.

Some variants are also more common in certain countries due to keyboard layouts. For example, the smiley =) may occur in Scandinavia. Diacritical marks are sometimes used. The letters Ö and Ü can be seen as emoticons, as the upright versions of :O (meaning that one is surprised) and :D (meaning that one is very happy), respectively. In countries where the Cyrillic alphabet is used, the right parenthesis ) is used as a smiley. Multiple parentheses )))) are used to express greater happiness, amusement or laughter. The colon is omitted due to being in a lesser-known position on the ЙЦУКЕН keyboard layout. The 'shrug' emoticon, ¯\_(ツ)_/¯, uses the glyph ツ from the Japanese katakana writing system.

=== Kaomoji (Japan ASCII movement) ===
Kaomoji are often seen as the Japanese development of emoticons that is separate to the Scott Fahlman movement, which started in 1982. In 1986, a designer began to use brackets and other ASCII text characters to form faces. Over time, they became more often differentiated from each other, although both use ASCII characters. However, more westernised Kaomojis have dropped the brackets, such as owo, uwu and TwT, popularised in internet subcultures such as the anime and furry communities.

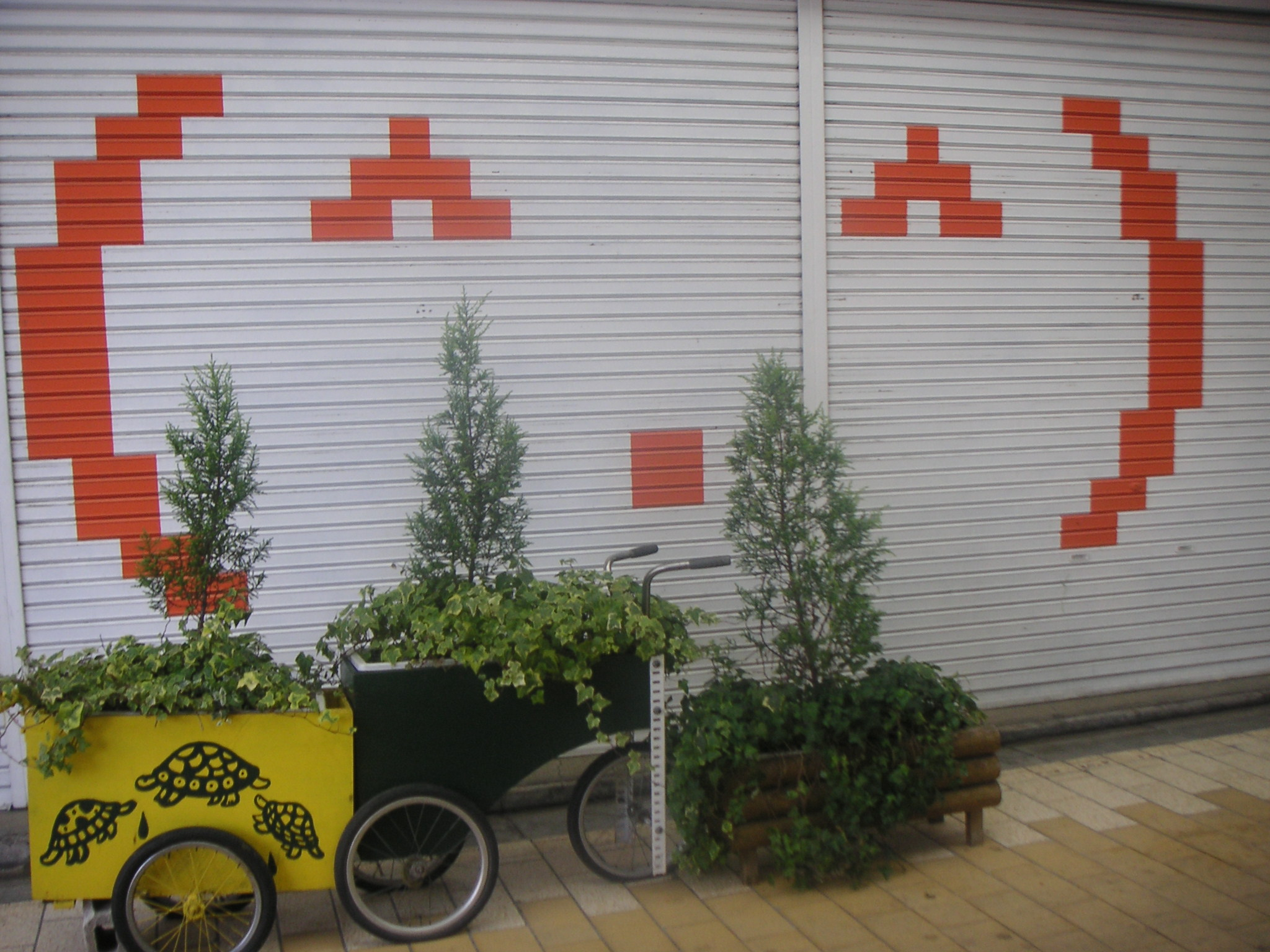
A kaomoji painting in Japan

=== 2channel ===
Users of the Japanese discussion board 2channel, in particular, have developed a variety emoticons using characters from various scripts, such as Kannada, as in ಠ_ಠ (for a look of disapproval, disbelief or confusion). Similarly, the letter ರೃ was used in emoticons to represent a monocle and ಥ to represent a tearing eye. They were picked up by 4chan and spread to other Western sites soon after. Some have become characters in their own right like Monā.

=== Korean ===
In South Korea, emoticons use Korean Hangul letters, and the Western style is rarely used. The structures of Korean and Japanese emoticons are somewhat similar, but they have some differences. Korean style contains Korean jamo (letters) instead of other characters.

The consonant jamos ㅅ, ㅁ or ㅂ can be used as the mouth or nose component and ㅇ, ㅎ or ㅍ for the eyes. Using quotation marks " and apostrophes ' are also commonly used combinations. Vowel jamos such as ㅜ and ㅠ can depict a crying face. Example: ㅜㅜ, (same function as T in Western style). Sometimes ㅡ (not an em-dash "—", but a vowel jamo), a comma (,) or an underscore (_) is added, and the two character sets can be mixed together, as in ㅠ.ㅡ, ㅡ^ㅜ and ㅜㅇㅡ. Also, semicolons and carets are commonly used in Korean emoticons; semicolons can mean sweating, examples of it are -;/, --^ and -_-;;.

=== Chinese ideographic ===
The character 囧 (U+56E7), which means 'patterned window', may be combined with the posture emoticon Orz, such as 囧rz. The character existed in Oracle bone script but was rarely used until its use as an emoticon, documented as early as January 20, 2005.

Other variants of 囧 include 崮 (king 囧), 莔 (queen 囧), 商 (囧 with a hat), 囧興 (turtle) and 卣 (Bomberman). The character 槑 (U+69D1), a variant of 梅 'plum', is used to represent a double of 呆 'dull' or further magnitude of dullness. In Chinese, normally full characters (as opposed to the stylistic use of 槑) might be duplicated to express emphasis.

== Posture emoticons ==
=== Orz ===
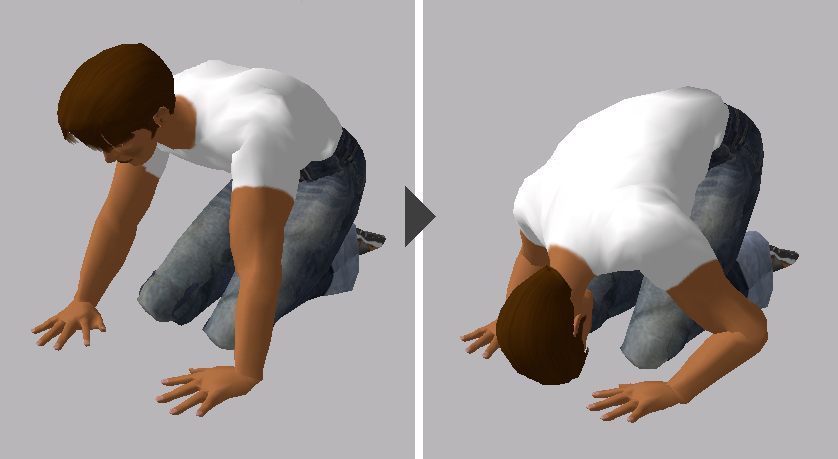
The emoticon Orz resembles a person performing a Japanese dogeza bow.

Orz (other forms include: Or2, on_, OTZ, OTL, STO, JTO, _no, _冂○ and 囧rz) is an emoticon representing a kneeling or bowing person (the Japanese version of which is called dogeza), with the "o" being the head, the "r" being the arms and part of the body, and the "z" being part of the body and the legs. This stick figure can represent respect or kowtowing, but commonly appears along a range of responses, including "frustration, despair, sarcasm, or grudging respect".

It was first used in late 2002 at the forum on Techside, a Japanese personal website. At the "Techside FAQ Forum" (TECHSIDE教えて君BBS(教えてBBS)), a poster asked about a cable cover, typing "_|￣|○" to show a cable and its cover. Others commented that it looked like a kneeling person, and the symbol became popular. These comments were soon deleted as they were considered off-topic. By 2005, Orz spawned a subculture: blogs have been devoted to the emoticon, and URL shortening services have been named after it. In Taiwan, Orz is associated with the concept of nice guys.

=== o7 ===
o7, or O7, is an emoticon that depicts a person saluting, with the o being the head and the 7 being its arm.

== Multimedia variations ==
A portmanteau of emotion and sound, an emotisound is a brief sound transmitted and played back during the viewing of a message, typically an IM message or email message. The sound is intended to communicate an emotional subtext. Some services, such as MuzIcons, combine emoticons and music players in an Adobe Flash-based widget. In 2004, the Trillian chat application introduced a feature called "emotiblips", which allows Trillian users to stream files to their instant message recipients "as the voice and video equivalent of an emoticon".

In 2007, MTV and Paramount Home Entertainment promoted the "emoticlip" as a form of viral marketing for the second season of the show The Hills. The emoticlips were twelve short snippets of dialogue from the show, uploaded to YouTube. The emoticlip concept is credited to the Bradley & Montgomery advertising firm, which wrote that they hoped it would be widely adopted as "greeting cards that just happen to be selling something".

== Intellectual property rights ==
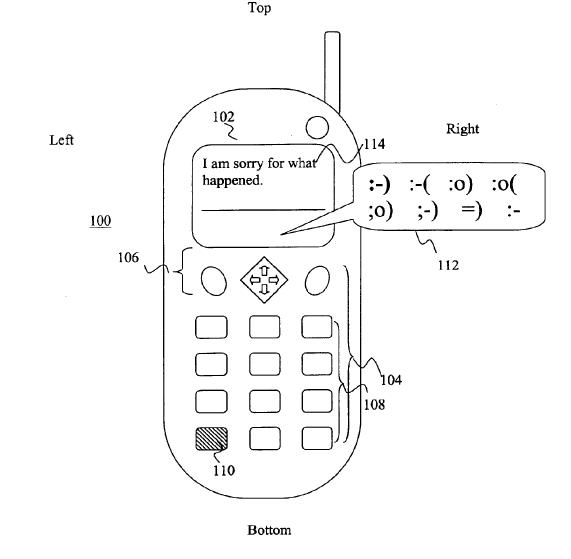
Patented drop down menu for composing phone mail text message with emoticons

In 2000, Despair, Inc. obtained a U.S. trademark registration for the "frowny" emoticon :-( when used on "greeting cards, posters and art prints". In 2001, they issued a satirical press release, announcing that they would sue Internet users who typed the frowny; the company received protests when its mock release was posted on technology news website Slashdot.

A number of patent applications have been filed on inventions that assist in communicating with emoticons. A few of these have been issued as US patents. US 6987991, for example, discloses a method developed in 2001 to send emoticons over a cell phone using a drop-down menu. The stated advantage was that it eases entering emoticons.

The emoticon :-) was also filed in 2006 and registered in 2008 as a European Community Trademark (CTM). In Finland, the Supreme Administrative Court ruled in 2012 that the emoticon cannot be trademarked, thus repealing a 2006 administrative decision trademarking the emoticons :-), =), =(, :) and :(. In 2005, a Russian court rejected a legal claim against Siemens by a man who claimed to hold a trademark on the ;-) emoticon. In 2008, Russian entrepreneur Oleg Teterin claimed to have been granted the trademark on the ;-) emoticon. A license would not "cost that much—tens of thousands of dollars" for companies but would be free of charge for individuals.

== Unicode ==
A different, but related, use of the term "emoticon" is found in the Unicode Standard, referring to a subset of emoji that display facial expressions. The standard explains this usage with reference to existing systems, which provided functionality for substituting certain textual emoticons with images or emoji of the expressions in question.

Some smiley faces were present in Unicode since 1.1, including a white frowning face, a white smiling face and a black smiling face ("black" refers to a glyph which is filled, "white" refers to a glyph which is unfilled).

Miscellaneous Symbols (partial)^{[1]}^{[2]}^{[3]} Official Unicode Consortium code chart (PDF)
	0	1	2	3	4	5	6	7	8	9	A	B	C	D	E	F
U+263x	☹	☺	☻													
Notes 1.As of Unicode version 18.0 2.Empty areas indicate code points assigned to non-emoticon characters 3.U+263A and U+263B are inherited from Microsoft code page 437 introduced in 1981, although inspired by older systems

The Emoticons block was introduced in Unicode Standard version 6.0 (published in October 2010) and extended by 7.0. It covers Unicode range from U+1F600 to U+1F64F fully.

Emoticons^{[1]} Official Unicode Consortium code chart (PDF)
	0	1	2	3	4	5	6	7	8	9	A	B	C	D	E	F
U+1F60x	😀	😁	😂	😃	😄	😅	😆	😇	😈	😉	😊	😋	😌	😍	😎	😏
U+1F61x	😐	😑	😒	😓	😔	😕	😖	😗	😘	😙	😚	😛	😜	😝	😞	😟
U+1F62x	😠	😡	😢	😣	😤	😥	😦	😧	😨	😩	😪	😫	😬	😭	😮	😯
U+1F63x	😰	😱	😲	😳	😴	😵	😶	😷	😸	😹	😺	😻	😼	😽	😾	😿
U+1F64x	🙀	🙁	🙂	🙃	🙄	🙅	🙆	🙇	🙈	🙉	🙊	🙋	🙌	🙍	🙎	🙏
Notes 1.As of Unicode version 18.0

After that block had been filled, Unicode 8.0 (2015), 9.0 (2016) and 10.0 (2017) added additional emoticons in the range from U+1F910 to U+1F9FF. Currently, U+1F90C – U+1F90F, U+1F93F, U+1F94D – U+1F94F, U+1F96C – U+1F97F, U+1F998 – U+1F9CF (excluding U+1F9C0 which contains the 🧀 emoji) and U+1F9E7 – U+1F9FF do not contain any emoticons since Unicode 10.0.

Supplemental Symbols and Pictographs^{[1]} Official Unicode Consortium code chart (PDF)
	0	1	2	3	4	5	6	7	8	9	A	B	C	D	E	F
U+1F90x	🤀	🤁	🤂	🤃	🤄	🤅	🤆	🤇	🤈	🤉	🤊	🤋	🤌	🤍	🤎	🤏
U+1F91x	🤐	🤑	🤒	🤓	🤔	🤕	🤖	🤗	🤘	🤙	🤚	🤛	🤜	🤝	🤞	🤟
U+1F92x	🤠	🤡	🤢	🤣	🤤	🤥	🤦	🤧	🤨	🤩	🤪	🤫	🤬	🤭	🤮	🤯
U+1F93x	🤰	🤱	🤲	🤳	🤴	🤵	🤶	🤷	🤸	🤹	🤺	🤻	🤼	🤽	🤾	🤿
U+1F94x	🥀	🥁	🥂	🥃	🥄	🥅	🥆	🥇	🥈	🥉	🥊	🥋	🥌	🥍	🥎	🥏
U+1F95x	🥐	🥑	🥒	🥓	🥔	🥕	🥖	🥗	🥘	🥙	🥚	🥛	🥜	🥝	🥞	🥟
U+1F96x	🥠	🥡	🥢	🥣	🥤	🥥	🥦	🥧	🥨	🥩	🥪	🥫	🥬	🥭	🥮	🥯
U+1F97x	🥰	🥱	🥲	🥳	🥴	🥵	🥶	🥷	🥸	🥹	🥺	🥻	🥼	🥽	🥾	🥿
U+1F98x	🦀	🦁	🦂	🦃	🦄	🦅	🦆	🦇	🦈	🦉	🦊	🦋	🦌	🦍	🦎	🦏
U+1F99x	🦐	🦑	🦒	🦓	🦔	🦕	🦖	🦗	🦘	🦙	🦚	🦛	🦜	🦝	🦞	🦟
U+1F9Ax	🦠	🦡	🦢	🦣	🦤	🦥	🦦	🦧	🦨	🦩	🦪	🦫	🦬	🦭	🦮	🦯
U+1F9Bx	🦰	🦱	🦲	🦳	🦴	🦵	🦶	🦷	🦸	🦹	🦺	🦻	🦼	🦽	🦾	🦿
U+1F9Cx	🧀	🧁	🧂	🧃	🧄	🧅	🧆	🧇	🧈	🧉	🧊	🧋	🧌	🧍	🧎	🧏
U+1F9Dx	🧐	🧑	🧒	🧓	🧔	🧕	🧖	🧗	🧘	🧙	🧚	🧛	🧜	🧝	🧞	🧟
U+1F9Ex	🧠	🧡	🧢	🧣	🧤	🧥	🧦	🧧	🧨	🧩	🧪	🧫	🧬	🧭	🧮	🧯
U+1F9Fx	🧰	🧱	🧲	🧳	🧴	🧵	🧶	🧷	🧸	🧹	🧺	🧻	🧼	🧽	🧾	🧿
Notes 1.As of Unicode version 18.0

For historic and compatibility reasons, some other heads and figures, which mostly represent different aspects like genders, activities, and professions instead of emotions, are also found in Miscellaneous Symbols and Pictographs (especially U+1F466 – U+1F487) and Transport and Map Symbols. Body parts, mostly hands, are also encoded in the Dingbat and Miscellaneous Symbols blocks.

== See also ==
- Emotions in virtual communication
- Henohenomoheji
- Hieroglyph
- iConji
- Sitelen Pona
- Internet slang
- Irony punctuation
- Kaoani
- List of emoticons
- Martian language
- Pixel art
- Tête à Toto
- Written language
- Typographic alignment
- Typographic approximation
