= Sneer =

Facial expression of scorn or disgust

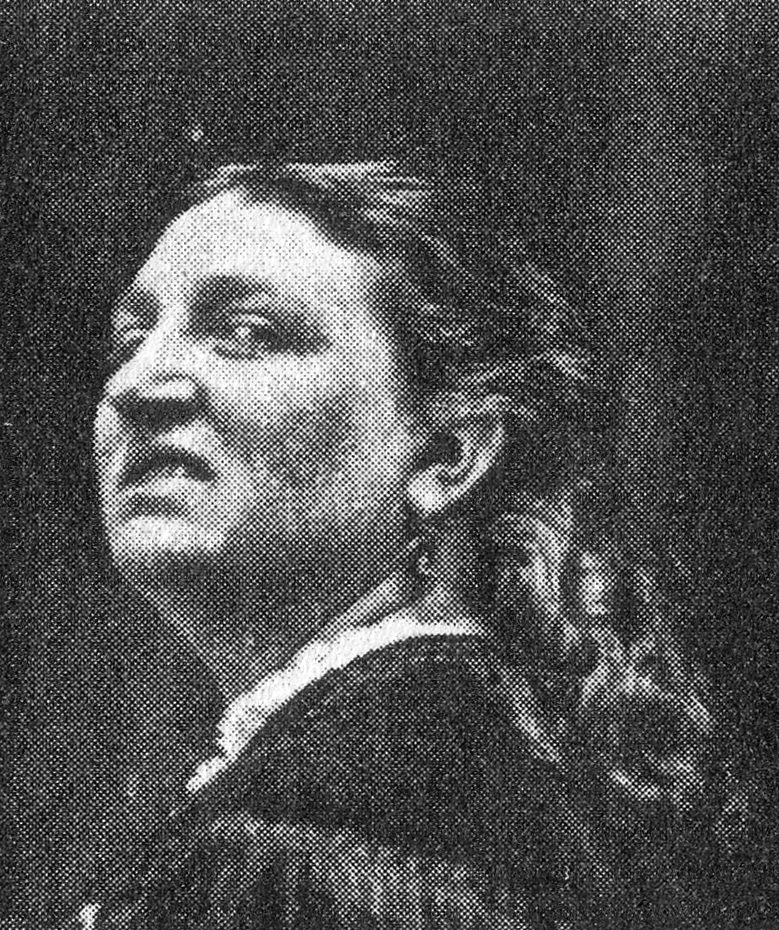
Depiction of sneering used in Darwin's The Expression of Emotions in Man and Animals

A sneer is a facial expression of scorn or disgust characterized by a slight raising of one corner of the upper lip, known also as curling the lip or turning up the nose. In The Expression of Emotions in Man and Animals, Charles Darwin defined a "sneer" as "the upper lip being retracted in such a manner that the canine tooth on one side of the face alone is shown" Darwin related the sneer to the snarl observed in non-human animals, particularly carnivores, observing that:

The uncovering of the canine tooth is the result of a double movement. The angle or corner of the mouth is drawn a little backwards, and at the same time a muscle which runs parallel to and near the nose draws up the outer part of the upper lip, and exposes the canine on this side of the face. The contraction of this muscle makes a distinct furrow on the cheek, and produces strong wrinkles under the eye, especially at its inner corner. The action is the same as that of a snarling dog; and a dog when pretending to fight often draws up the lip on one side alone, namely that facing his antagonist.

It is suggested that the sneer is a universal expression of contempt and that Darwin was the first to observe this. Cats may be observed to sneer, though this is probably related to the Flehmen response.

== In popular culture ==
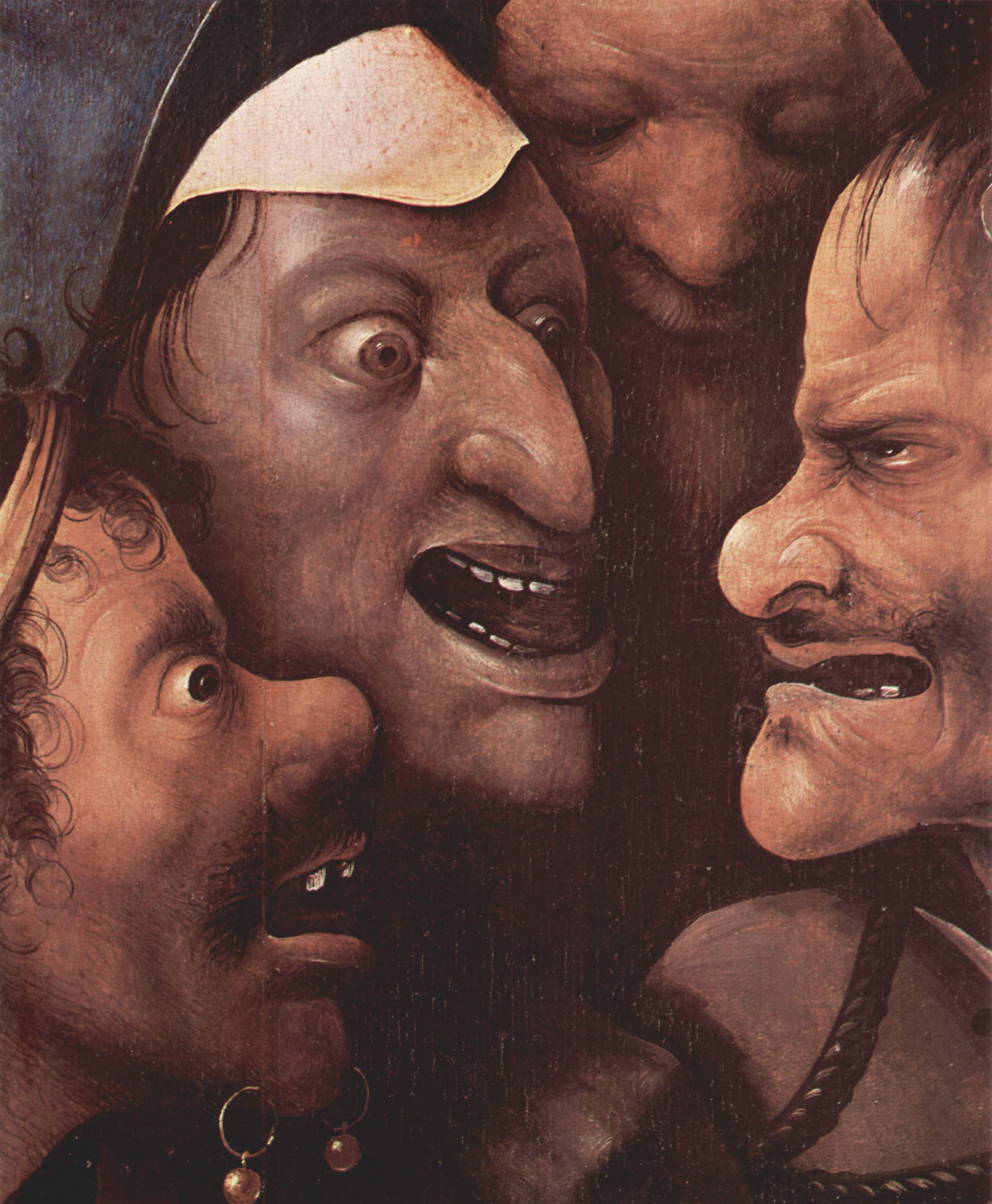
"Christ Carrying the Cross" (1515 AD) by Hieronymus Bosch — illustrating the facial expression known as a "sneer"

- In Wuthering Heights, Emily Brontë used the sneer—as perceived by the novel's narrator, the housekeeper Ellen Dean ("Nelly")—to epitomize the personality of Heathcliff, the lead character.
- The horror genre actor Vincent Price delivered his characters' lines with a trademark sneer.
- Punk rock musician Billy Idol is also known for a trademark sneer.
- In the Harry Potter stories, Draco Malfoy and his father are notorious for their sinister sneers, which represent these characters' sense of entitlement over and contempt for those judged lacking in monetary, power, or family status.
- More than one commentator has depicted pop culture judicial panels such as those seen on American Idol and Britain's Got Talent as regularly sneering upon their hapless contestants.
- The cartoon character Cyril Sneer from the Canadian series The Raccoons has a sneer as his namesake.
- Former U.S. vice president Dick Cheney's political opponents have at times perceived him as looking upon them with a sneer.

== See also ==
- Smirk
- Snarl
