= Jiong =

Chinese character

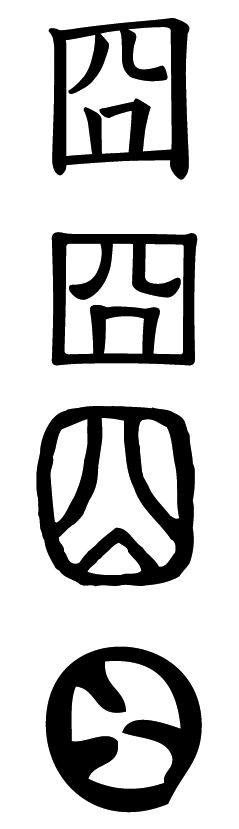
Jiong (囧) in Kaishu, Clerical, Seal, and Oracle bone scripts (top to bottom)

Jiong (Chinese: 囧; pinyin: jiǒng; Jyutping: gwing2) is a once obscure Chinese character meaning a "patterned window". Since 2008, it has become an internet phenomenon and widely used to express embarrassment and gloom because of the character's resemblance to a sad facial expression.

It has historically been used as a Chinese dictionary radical and has Shuowen Jiezi number 240, but it is not included among the Kangxi radicals, nor by the Table of Indexing Chinese Character Components.

== Original meanings ==
1. Window, according to Xu Shen's 2nd-century dictionary Shuowen Jiezi: "窻牖麗廔闓明" ('an open and light window').
2. Granary. 米囧 means "put the new rice into a granary".
3. Sacrificial place. Based on Chouli.
4. Toponym.

=== Characters with Shuowen radical 240 ===
strokes	character
+0	囧 冏
+4	朙
+5	𥁰
+6	𧖸
+9	𥂗

== Internet emoticon ==
A stylised version of the 囧 emoticon

The character for jiong is nowadays more widely used on the Internet as an ideographic emoticon representing a range of moods, as it resembles a person's face. It is commonly used to express ideas or feelings such as annoyance, shock, embarrassment, awkwardness, etc.

The use of jiong as an emoticon can be traced to 2005 or earlier; it was referenced on 20 January 2005 in a Chinese-language article on Orz. The character is sometimes used in conjunction with orz, OTZ, or its other variants to form "囧rz", representing a person on their hands and knees (jiong forming the face, while r and z represent arms and legs, respectively) and symbolising despair or failure.

== Encoding ==
The character is included in Unicode at U+56E7 (囧). Unicode also includes U+518F (冏), which is considered a variant.

Character information
Preview	囧		冏	
Unicode name	CJK UNIFIED IDEOGRAPH-56E7		CJK UNIFIED IDEOGRAPH-518F	
Encodings	decimal	hex	dec	hex
Unicode	22247	U+56E7	20879	U+518F
UTF-8	229 155 167	E5 9B A7	229 134 143	E5 86 8F
Numeric character reference	&#22247;	&#x56E7;	&#20879;	&#x518F;
Shift JIS			153 103	99 67
EUC-JP	143 182 250	8F B6 FA	209 200	D1 C8
GBK / GB 18030	135 229	87 E5	131 215	83 D7
KPS 9566-2011			200 130	C8 82
Big5	202 168	CA A8	202 106	CA 6A
EUC-TW	142 162 163 200	8E A2 A3 C8	142 162 163 172	8E A2 A3 AC
CCCII / EACC	33 115 119	21 73 77	33 105 110	21 69 6E
Kangxi Dictionary reference	Page 217, character 10		Page 129, character 12	
