= Uwu =

Emoticon denoting cuteness, smiling or happiness

Stylized uwu emoticon as a blushing face

uwu (/ˈuːwuː/), also stylized UwU, is an emoticon representing a cute face. The u characters represent closed eyes, while the w represents a cat mouth. It is used to express various warm, happy, or affectionate feelings.

== Usage and variants ==
The emoticon uwu is often used to denote cuteness (kawaii), happiness, or tenderness. Excessive usage of the emoticon can also have the intended effect of annoying its recipient. It is popularly used in the furry fandom.

=== OwO ===
The emoticon also has a more surprised and sometimes allusive variant, owo (also stylized OwO; /ˈoʊwoʊ/; also associated with the furry fandom) that may also denote cuteness, as well as curiosity and perplexity (often the response "what's this?"). owo gained popularity in 2018; as opposed to uwu, the o characters represent open eyes. It is also sometimes used for trolling.

=== TwT ===
Another variant, TwT, is often used to symbolize crying, with each T representing a closed eye with tears streaming down.

== History ==
The emoticon uwu is known to date back as far as April 11, 2000, when it was used by furry artist Ghislain Deslierres in a post on the furry art site VCL (Vixen Controlled Library). A 2005 anime fanfiction contained another early use of the word. The origin of the term is unknown, with many people believing it to originate in Internet chat rooms. By 2014, the emoticon had spread across the Internet into Tumblr, becoming an Internet subculture.

The word uwu is included in the Royal Spanish Academy's word observatory, (Note: The word observatory is a website owned by the Royal Spanish Academy featuring words that are not included in the Diccionario de la lengua española and that have not been considered for inclusion, but for which people have wanted to know the meaning, including technical terms, neologisms, and foreign words.) defined as an "emoticon used to show happiness or tenderness".

== See also ==
- List of emoticons
