= Kaomoji =

Emoticons using Japanese characters

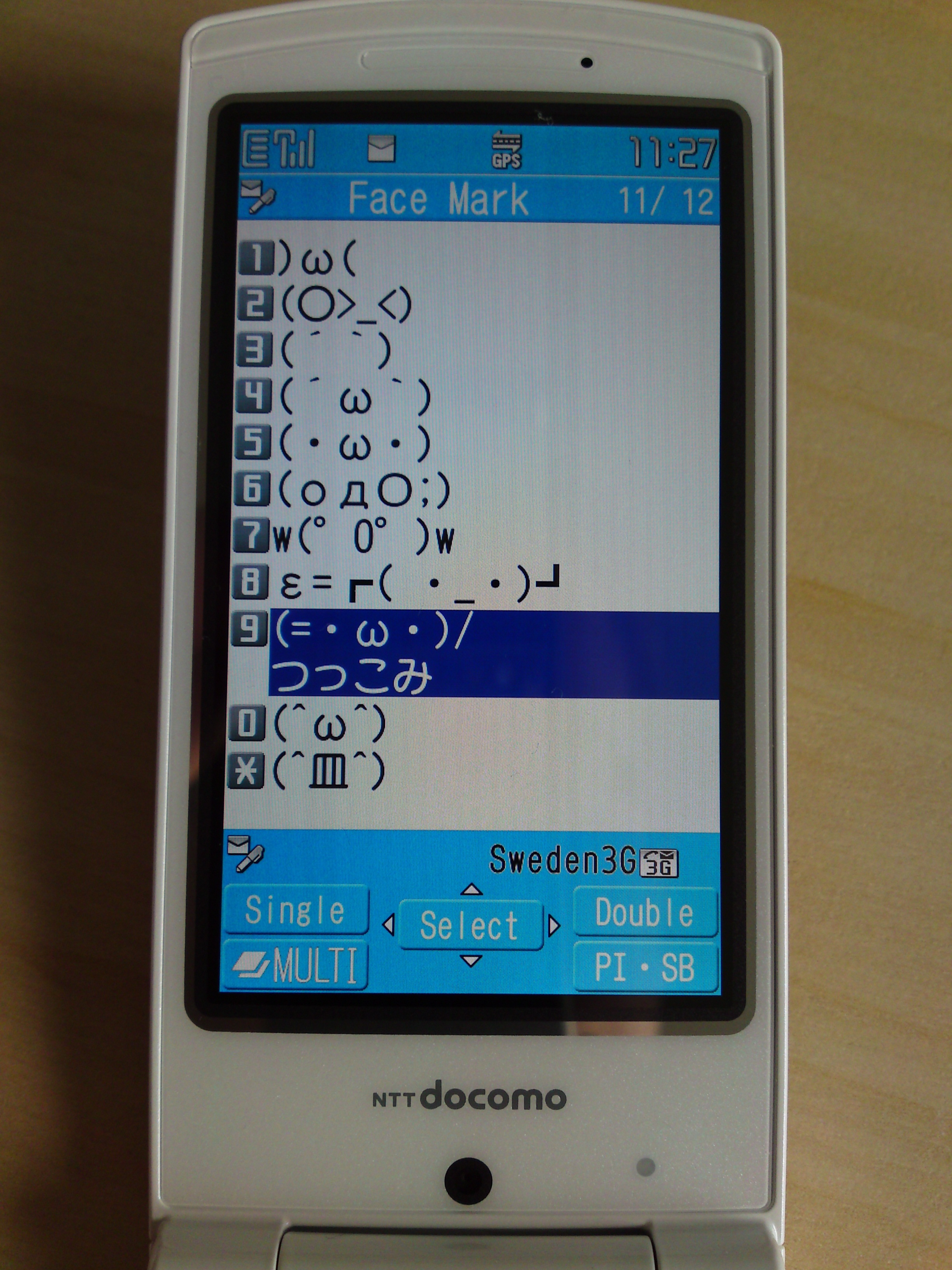
Kaomoji on a Japanese NTT Docomo mobile phone

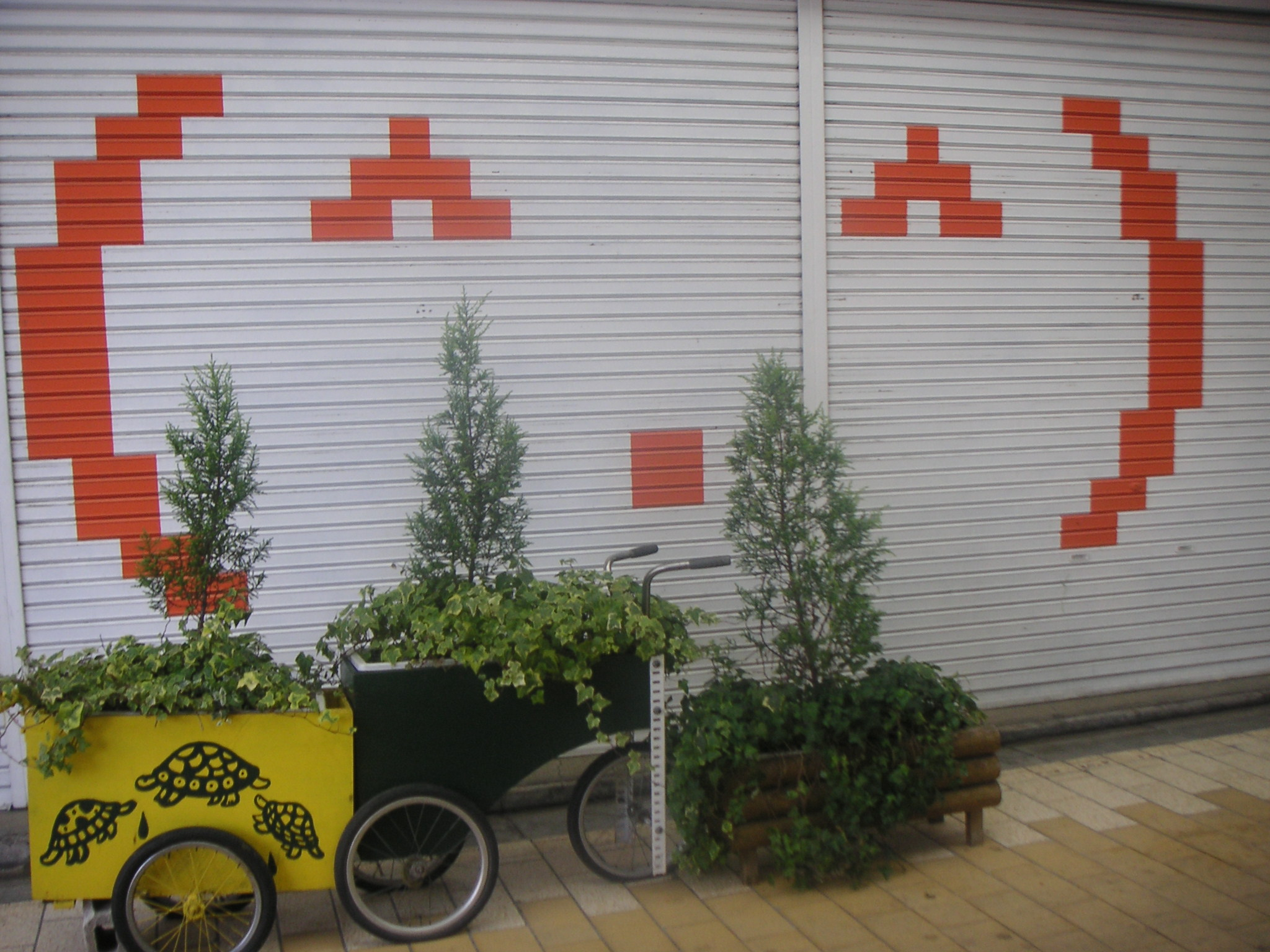
A Kaomoji painting in Japan

Kaomoji (Note: 顔文字, kaomoji, lit. 'face characters') are Japanese emoticons that use combinations of text characters to represent facial expressions and emotions. They first appeared in Japan during the 1980s, offering a distinctive way to convey tone and mood in digital communication. Common examples include:

- (^ω^) – expresses happiness or excitement
- ( ͡o╭╮ ͡o) – conveys sadness or disappointment

Kaomoji developed independently around the same time that sideways emoticons (or smileys) began appearing in the United States, such as:

- :) or :-) – happy
- :( or :-( – unhappy

Unlike Western emoticons, which are typically viewed sideways, kaomoji are meant to be read upright and often make use of a wider variety of characters. They are considered a precursor to modern emoji, which also originated in Japan.

== History ==
Users from Japan popularized a style of emoticons that can be understood without tilting one's head. This style arose on ASCII NET, an early Japanese online service, in the 1980s. They often include Japanese typography in addition to ASCII characters, and in contrast to Western-style emoticons, tend to emphasize the eyes, rather than the mouth.

Yasushi Wakabayashi is credited with inventing the original kaomoji (^_^) in 1986. Similar-looking emoticons were used on the Byte Information Exchange (BIX) around the same time. Whereas Western emoticons were first used by US computer scientists, kaomoji were most commonly used by young girls and fans of Japanese comics (manga). Linguist Ilaria Moschini suggests this is partly due to the kawaii ('cuteness') aesthetic of kaomoji. These emoticons are usually found in a format similar to (*_*). The asterisks indicate the eyes; the central character, commonly an underscore, the mouth; and the parentheses, the outline of the face.

Different emotions can be expressed by changing the character representing the eyes: for example, "T" can be used to express crying or sadness: (T_T). T_T may also be used to mean "unimpressed". The emphasis on the eyes in this style is reflected in the common usage of emoticons that use only the eyes, e.g. ^^. Looks of stress are represented by the likes of (x_x), while (-_-;) is a generic emoticon for nervousness, the semicolon representing an anxiety-induced sweat drop (discussed further below). /// can indicate embarrassment by symbolizing blushing, resembling the lines drawn on cheeks in manga. Characters like hyphens or periods can replace the underscore; the period is often used for a smaller, "cuter" mouth, or to represent a nose, e.g. (^.^). Alternatively, the mouth/nose can be left out entirely, e.g. (^^).

Parentheses are sometimes replaced with braces or square brackets, e.g. {^_^} or [o_0]. Many times, the parentheses are left out completely, e.g. ^^, ^-^, >.<, o_O, O.O, e_e, or e.e. A quotation mark ", apostrophe ', or semicolon ; can be added to the emoticon to imply apprehension or embarrassment, in the same way that a sweat drop is used in manga and anime. Anime forum posters at some point in the 2000s began using the Japanese style kaomoji. As a result, Americans and westerners began to use various kaomoji, often referring to them as emoticons. Some of the designs did differ, mainly due to the differences between western and Japanese keyboards.

Communication software allowing the use of Shift JIS encoded characters rather than just ASCII allowed for the development of more kaomoji using the extended character set including hiragana, katakana, kanji, symbols, Greek and Cyrillic alphabet, such as (^ム^), (`Д´) or (益).

Modern communication software generally utilizes Unicode, which allows for the incorporation of characters from other languages and a variety of symbols into the kaomoji, as in ¯\_(⌐■-■)_/¯(◕‿◕✿) (❤ω❤) (づ ◕‿◕ )づ (▰˘◡˘▰). Further variations can be produced using Unicode combining characters, as in ٩(͡๏̯͡๏)۶ or ᶘᵒᴥᵒᶅ.

A kaoani GIF depicting a dancing onigiri.

An animated variant of kaomoji are kaoani (顔アニ (kao ani, face animation), which are small, animated pixel art emoticons that often appear as bouncing or floating heads or figures. The most common file format for kaoani is GIF, due to its widespread support for short, looping animations. They were frequently embedded in Internet forum signatures, blogs, early social networking sites, and instant messaging software.

== Combinations with Western style ==
English-language anime forums adopted those Japanese-style emoticons that could be used with the standard ASCII characters available on Western keyboards. Because of this, they are often called "anime style" emoticons in English. They have since seen use in more mainstream venues, including online gaming, instant-messaging, and non-anime-related discussion forums. Emoticons such as <( ^.^ )>, <(^_^<), <(o_o<), <( -'.'- )>, <('.'-^), or (>';..;')> which include the parentheses, mouth or nose, and arms (especially those represented by the inequality signs < or >) also are often referred to as "Kirbys" in reference to their likeness to Nintendo's video game character Kirby. The parentheses are sometimes dropped when used in the English language context, and the underscore of the mouth may be extended as an intensifier for the emoticon in question, e.g. ^_________^ for very happy. The emoticon t(-_-t) uses the Eastern style, but incorporates a depiction of the Western "middle-finger flick-off" using a "t" as the arm, hand, and finger. Using a lateral click letter for the nose such as in ( ͡° ͜ʖ ͡°) is believed to originate from the Finnish image-based message board Ylilauta, and is called a "Lenny face". Another apparently Western invention is the use of emoticons like *,..,* or `;..;´ to indicate vampires or other mythical beasts with fangs.

Exposure to both Western and Japanese style emoticons or kaomoji through blogs, instant messaging, and forums featuring a blend of Western and Japanese pop culture has given rise to many emoticons that have an upright viewing format. The parentheses are often dropped, and these emoticons typically only use alphanumeric characters and the most commonly used English punctuation marks. Emoticons such as -O-, -3-, -w-, '_', ;_;, T_T, :>, and .V. are used to convey mixed emotions that are more difficult to convey with traditional emoticons. Characters are sometimes added to emoticons to convey an anime- or manga-styled sweat drop, for example ^_^', !>_<!, <@>_____<@>;;, ;O;, and *u*. The equals sign can also be used for closed, anime-looking eyes, for example =0=, =3=, =w=, =A=, and =7=. The uwu face (and its variations UwU and OwO), is an emoticon of Japanese origin which denotes a cute expression or emotion felt by the user, but has more recently become associated with the furry fandom. Sometimes combining characters (accents) are added to emoticons to represent eyebrows, as in ò_ó, ó_ò, õ_o, ù_u, o_Ô, or ( •̀ ᴗ •́ ).

As digital communication platforms evolved, these horizontal and vertical typographic expressions laid the groundwork for modern Unicode-based kaomoji and custom dynamic stickers. The advent of multi-byte character sets and expanded Unicode standards allowed users to combine symbols from diverse scripts—such as Cyrillic, Kannada, and Greek—to construct far more intricate facial expressions and multi-character scenes, leading to dedicated online kaomoji repositories that index and categorize these complex typographic art forms. This continuous cross-pollination ultimately influenced mainstream mobile operating systems and messaging applications, bridging the gap between text-based ASCII art and contemporary standardized graphical emoji.

== Cultural impact and the 2channel legacy ==
The evolution and popularization of kaomoji were profoundly influenced by the Japanese anonymous message board 2channel (now 5channel). Unlike early Western emoticons, the 2channel community utilized the Shift JIS character set to develop highly sophisticated Shift_JIS art (commonly referred to as "AA"), which expanded kaomoji from simple facial expressions into full-bodied characters and narrative mascots. Iconic figures such as Monā (モナー) ( ´∀｀) and Giko Neko (ギコ猫) (,,ﾟДﾟ) emerged from this culture, becoming symbols of Japanese internet identity and starring in community-driven "Flash" animations and text-based theater. This "bulletin board" culture transformed kaomoji into a modular language, where users "hunted" for specialized characters in foreign scripts—such as the Kannada letter ಠ or the Greek ω to create more nuanced expressions. This aesthetic heavily influenced the development of early mobile emojis and eventually crossed over into Western digital culture via platforms like 4chan, where 2channel-style kaomoji such as the "table flip" (╯°□°）╯︵ ┻━┻ became global viral phenomena.

== Sources ==
- Seargeant, Philip (2019). The Emoji Revolution: How Technology is Shaping the Future of Communication. Cambridge University Press. ISBN 978-1-108-49664-3.
- Veszelszki, Ágnes (2017). Digilect: The Impact of Infocommunication Technology on Language. Berlin: Walter de Gruyter. ISBN 978-3-11-049911-7.
