= Dogeza =

Element of traditional Japanese etiquette

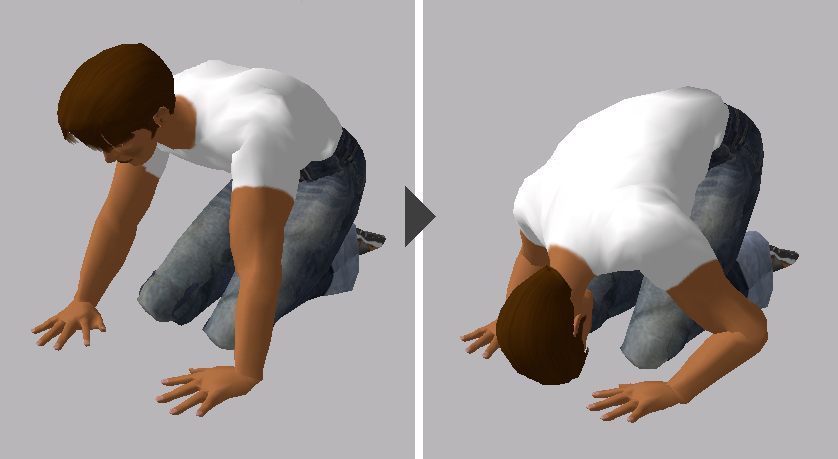
Two positions used in dogeza

Dogeza (土下座) is an element of traditional Japanese etiquette which involves kneeling directly on the ground and bowing to prostrate oneself while touching one's head to the floor. It is used to show deference to a person of higher status, as a deep apology or to express the desire for a favor from said person.

The term is used in Japanese politics such as "dogeza-gaikō" (土下座外交) which is translated to "kowtow diplomacy" or "kowtow foreign policy". In general, dogeza is translated into English as "prostration" or "kowtow".

== The meaning of performing dogeza ==
In the Japanese social consciousness, the act of sitting on the ground and creating a scene (dogeza), is an uncommon deference only used when one is deviating greatly from expected behavior. It is seen as part of etiquette and is an expression of remorse for troubling the other person. By performing dogeza and apologizing to someone, often the other person will be at least somewhat mollified.

== History ==
In the Gishiwajinden (魏志倭人伝), the oldest Chinese record of encounters with the Japanese, it was mentioned that commoners of the ancient Yamataikoku would, upon meeting noblemen along the road, fall prostrate on the spot, clapping their hands as in prayer (柏手 read: kashiwade), and this is believed to be an old Japanese custom.

The haniwa of the Kofun period can be seen prostrating themselves in dogeza.

In the early modern period, popularly as the daimyō's procession passed by, it is believed that it was mandatory for the commoners present to perform dogeza, but that is incorrect. It was normal for common people to perform dogeza in modern times when being interviewed by higher-ups.

Even now, as a method of self-protection and apology in which damage to one's image is neglected, its idea of feeling shame remains firmly rooted.

== See also ==
- Emoticon § Orz
- Kowtow
- Sujud
- Japanese culture
- Wa (name of Japan)
- Genuflection
- Prostration
- Prostration (Buddhism)
- Bowing in Eastern Orthodox Church tradition
