= Smirk =

Facial expression

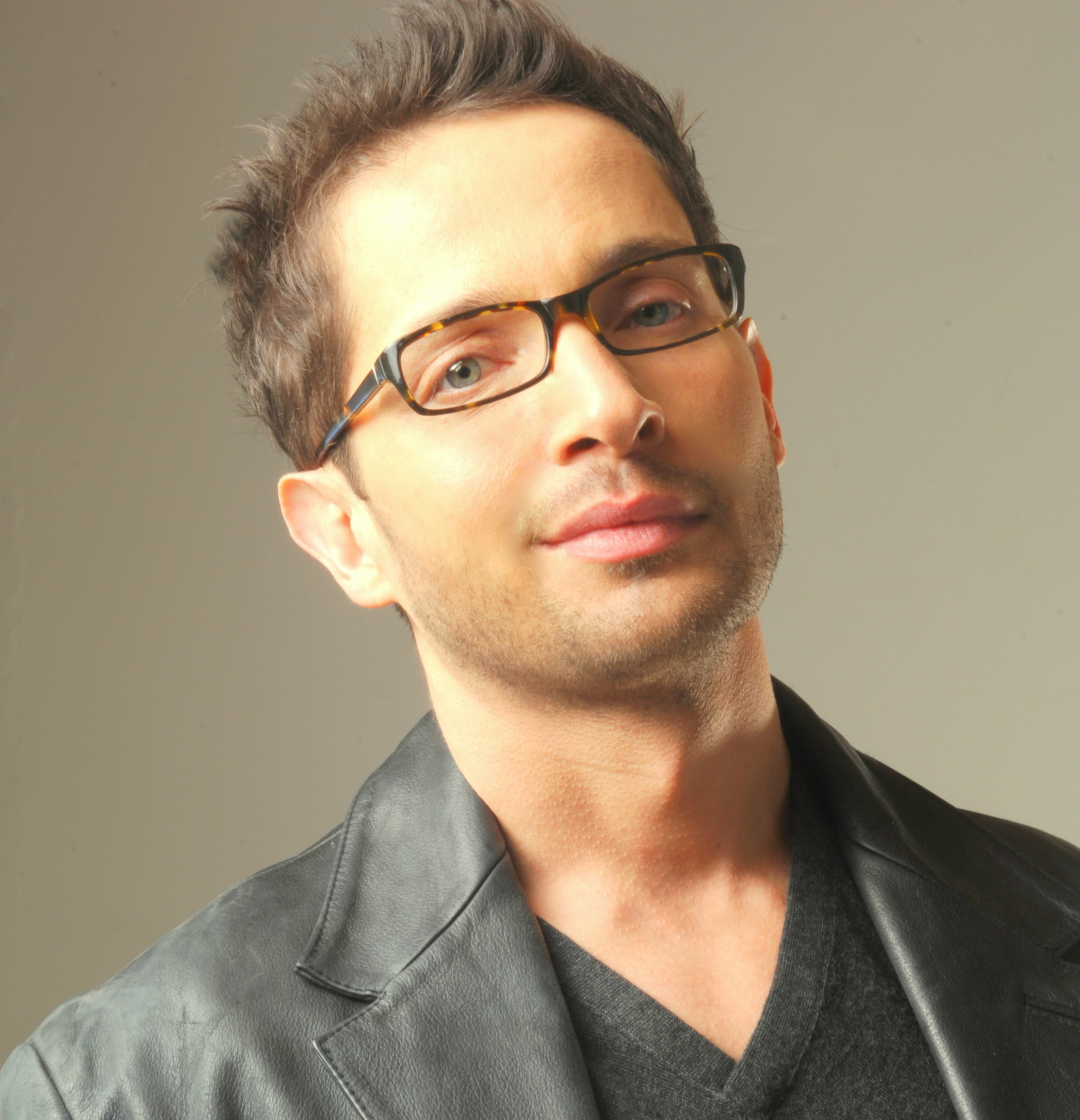
A man subtly smirking

A smirk is an affected, ingratiating smile evoking insolence, scorn, or offensive smugness.

Human ethology categorizes smirks as a kind of deformed-compliment signal.

== Historical examples ==
George Puttenham in the 16th century described what he called "a mock with a scornful countenance as in some smiling sort looking aside".

"A constant smirk upon the face, and a whiffling activity of the body, are strong indications of futility," the Earl of Chesterfield once wrote in a letter to his son.

German-born psychiatrist Fritz Perls considered the most difficult patients to be the clever know-it-alls, recognisable by what he called "a specific kind of smile, a kind of smirk, a smirk that says, 'Oh, you're an idiot! I know better. I can outwit you and control you'".

Mr Bennet describes Mr Wickham as making smirking love to all his new in-laws in the novel Pride and Prejudice.

== See also ==
- Schadenfreude
- Sneer
