= Savoring =

Concept in positive psychology

Savoring (or savouring in Commonwealth English) is the use of thoughts and actions to increase the intensity, duration, and appreciation of positive experiences and emotions. It is a topic commonly studied in the domain of positive psychology. It can also be referred to simply as the up-regulation of positive emotions. Traditional psychology attempts to develop methods of coping and dealing with negative emotions. Positive psychology uses the concept of savoring as a way to maximize the potential benefits that positive experiences and emotions can have on peoples' lives. The opposite of Savoring is known as dampening. Dampening is a method of dealing with positive affect by trying to feel worse, or down-regulate positive emotions.

Fred Bryant, a social psychologist at Loyola University Chicago, is considered to be the father of savoring research. He introduced the concept of savoring as being mindfully engaged and aware of one's feelings during positive events. By being engaged one can increase happiness in both the short and long run. So savoring is not merely the experience of positive emotions, but the deliberate effort to make a positive experience last.

== Major Theories ==
Psychological theories on savoring describe various facets of the construct such as its manifestation, operationalization, strategies to facilitate its occurrence, and its association with well-being. Work done by Fred Bryant in 2003 discusses savoring as manifesting in the following three forms:

1. Anticipation- or savoring in the form of the enjoyment of a forthcoming positive event
2. Being in the moment- savoring by lengthening and strengthening the present positive experience. Bryant, Smart & King (2005) suggest that such focus creates stronger, more intense memories to later be recalled in reminiscing
3. Reminiscing-Recalling memories in order to re-experience and thus savor positive emotions

Quoidbach, Berry, Hansenne & Mikolajczak (2010) have also worked on savoring theory and offer four general strategies for facilitating savoring:

1. Behavioral display- Using non-verbal cues to express one's positive emotions
2. Be Present- Having intentional, attentive focus on the current positive moment; also closely related to mindfulness.
3. Capitalizing- A social aspect in which an individual "communicates and celebrates with others"
4. Positive Mental Time Travel (past or future-focused)- reminiscing on or anticipating positive events

== Major Empirical Findings ==
Jose, Lim, and Bryant (2012) distinguish between two types of savoring: trait and state-based savoring. Trait-based savoring has been shown to be a more stable, generalized disposition to savor events in one's daily life while state-based savoring is a momentary episode of savoring behavior. While both appear important in terms of overall effects of savoring, trait savoring has the potential to be expressed through dampening, a response that depresses positive events.

In terms of age effects, Ramsey & Gentzler (2014) found that savoring can play an indirect role in subjective well-being across ages as savoring was reported to be greater for younger participants who perceived that they had more time left in their lives.

Smith & Bryant (2012) and Bryant & Yarnold (2014) showed a relationship between savoring tendencies and personality styles. Through studies about vacation enjoyment and college undergraduate achievement ideation, they showed that Type A people tend to not savor experiences as much as Type B people. Type A college students tend to enjoy the achievements in the present moment rather than savor the feelings for a future time because by doing so they might miss an opportunity for future achievement. Type B people also tend to enjoy vacations more than Type A people because of the savoring effect.

Conventional wisdom states that money doesn't buy happiness – and recent research by Jordi Quoidbach and colleagues has shown that wealthier people report less savoring ability. In the same study, Quoidbach and others found that when exposed to a reminder of wealth, people were less able to savor and enjoy a piece of chocolate.

Besides wealth, it has been found that self-esteem also affects savoring ability and emotional regulation. Wood et al. (2003) found that people with low self-esteem are less likely to try and savor a positive experience and also more likely to dampen their feelings when they feel good. One study showed that the higher a person's self-esteem the more they were expected to enjoy, celebrate and savor their own success.

== Applications ==
Positive emotions are linked to a variety of outcomes. According to Barbara Fredrickson's Broaden-and-Build Theory (2001), positive emotions can serve as a key element to human flourishing. Flourishing entails having high levels of social, emotional, and psychological well-being. Fredrickson's research also finds that they improve psychological resiliency, emotional well-being, counteract negative emotions, and broaden thought and action capabilities. Therefore, if one can increase the duration of positive emotions via savoring, then theoretically one should be more likely to reap the benefits of these more intense emotions.

Martin Seligman, American psychologist and one of the most avid supporters of the field of positive psychology, has posited that savoring strategies can be used in therapeutic settings. Supporting this position, research has found that savoring strategies have been found to help people build stronger relationships, improve their mental and physical health, and as a method of finding creative solutions to problems. It has also been shown to reduce feelings of hopelessness and increase positive affect. Some examples of savoring strategies provided by Quoidbach and his colleagues (2010) are prolonging positive emotions through nonverbal behavioral displays like facial expressions, consciously attending to a positive experience by focusing your attention (called "being present" by Quoidbach and his colleagues), capitalizing on a positive experience by celebrating and discussing it with others. A final savoring strategy proposed by Quoidbach is positive mental time travel. This involves either reminiscing on a past positive experience or anticipating a future positive event.

Hurley & Kwon (2011) had participants savor their moments and to recall positive experiences from their past week. The researchers found that depressive symptoms decreased in the savoring group as compared to the control group, yet positive affect remained unchanged. However, the researchers did consider the possibility that it takes time for the skills of savoring to develop to the point that they are able to influence positive emotions. It was also possible that they would have observed such effects if the study lasted longer. Miyamoto & Ma found that although most individuals do prefer to enjoy their positive experiences, Easterners (East Asians) have a tendency to do so at a lower rate than Westerners (European Americans in this study).

== Conclusion ==
Though there are controversial studies that do not provide supportive evidence in favor of the positive effects of savoring, most researchers and their data support that savoring does indeed have positive effects for cultivating individual well-being.

To take advantage of the benefits effects of savoring, Jose et al. (2012) and Quoidbach, Hansenne, and Mikolajczak (2010) discuss strategies that can be used to help people develop savoring as a skill including (but not limited to):

1. Sharing your good feelings with others
2. Taking a mental photograph by being acutely aware in the moment with intentions on recalling the mental photograph later
3. Sharpening your sensory perceptions by being attentive to the present moment
4. Comparing the outcome to something worse
5. Getting absorbed in the moment
6. Counting your blessings (giving thanks)
7. Avoid "killjoy" thinking by looking on the bright side
8. Behaviorally communicating positivity to others via positive facial expressions
9. Limiting "time is too fleeting" perceptions

These strategies are not mutually exclusive.

=== Future Directions of Savoring Research ===
Bryant et al. (2011) said that three unresolved issues in savoring research are: finding the specific neuropsychological processes involved with different savoring strategies, developing methods of measuring and analyzing savoring in real time, and finding the different developmental processes through which people acquire different savoring strategies. They also note that other areas of future research can include cultural differences and similarities in savoring, the relationship between savoring and negative emotions and outcomes, savoring intervention efforts, and the evolutionary implications of savoring.
