= Air kiss =

Type of social gesture, which references a kiss

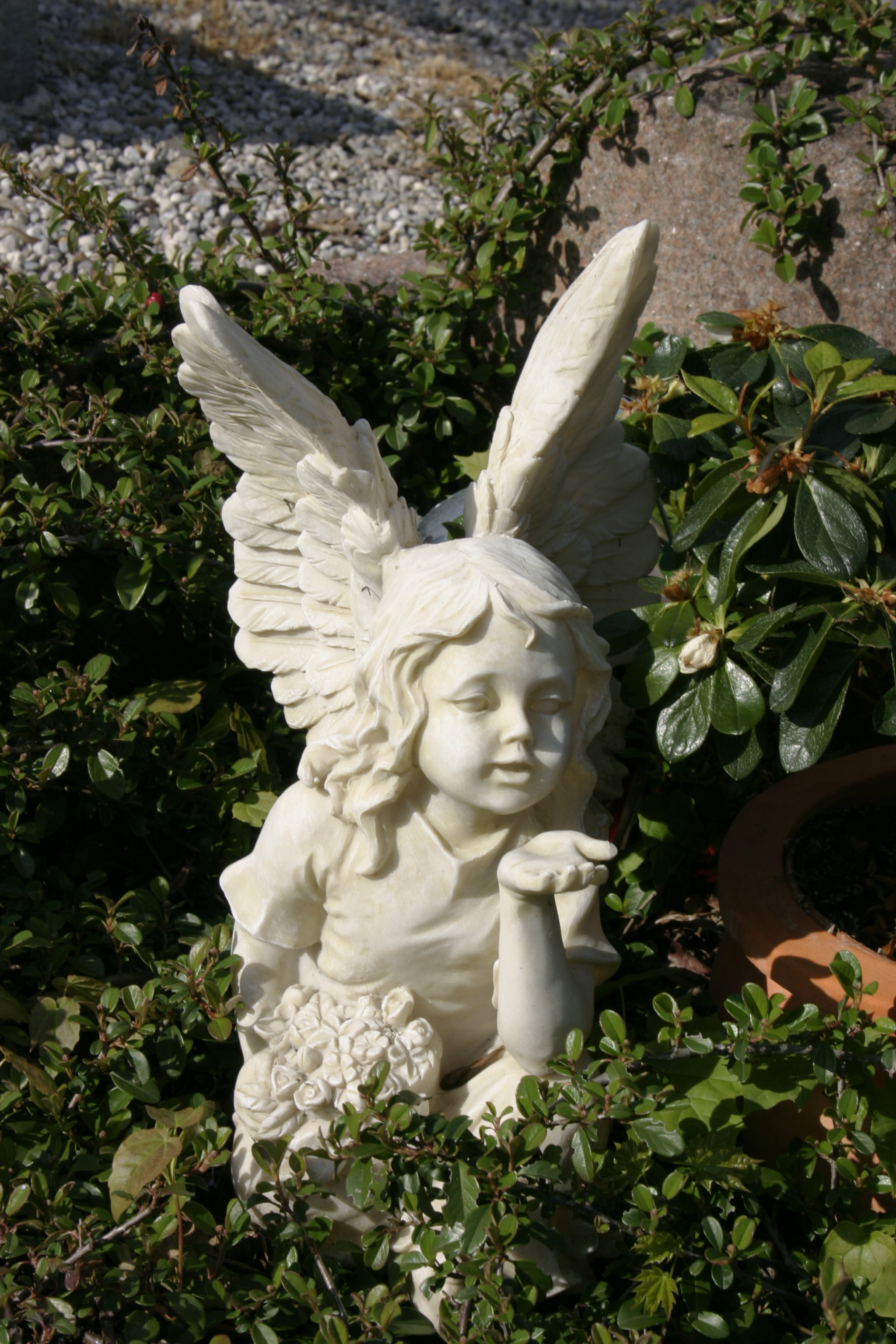
Statue of an angel blowing a kiss

An air kiss, blown kiss, or thrown kiss is a ritual or social gesture whose meaning is basically the same as that of many forms of kissing. The air kiss is a pretence of kissing: the lips are pursed as if kissing, but without actually touching the other person's body. Sometimes, the air kiss includes touching cheek-to-cheek. Also, the gesture may be accompanied by the mwah sound. The onomatopoeic word mwah (a representation of the sound of a kiss) has entered Webster's dictionary.

The character block Unicode 1F618 provides the "emoji face throwing a kiss 😘" to computer screens.

== Western culture ==
Francesco Totti blowing a kiss at UEFA Euro 2000

A symbolic kiss is frequent in Western cultures. A kiss can be "blown" to another by kissing the fingertips and then blowing the fingertips, pointing them in the direction of the recipient. This is used to convey affection, usually when parting or when the partners are physically distant but can view each other. Blown kisses are also used when a person wishes to convey affection to a large crowd or audience. The term flying kiss is used in India to describe a blown kiss.

=== North America ===
In North America and most western countries influenced by North America, air kisses are sometimes associated with glamour models and other celebrities. It is a modified cheek kiss, involving kissing in the air near the cheek, with the cheeks touching the lips or not.

== Southeast Asia ==
In Indonesia, and Malaysia, it is common to air-kiss an elder's hand as a traditional form of respectful greeting. Instead of pursing one's lips, the younger person exhaling through his nose softly on the hand before drawing the hand to the younger person's forehead.

In the Philippines, elder relatives traditionally kiss a younger relative's cheek in this same way, by exhaling gently through the nose when the younger relative's cheek is brought close.

== See also ==
- Air guitar
- Air quotes
