= Georges Meylan =

Swiss astronomer

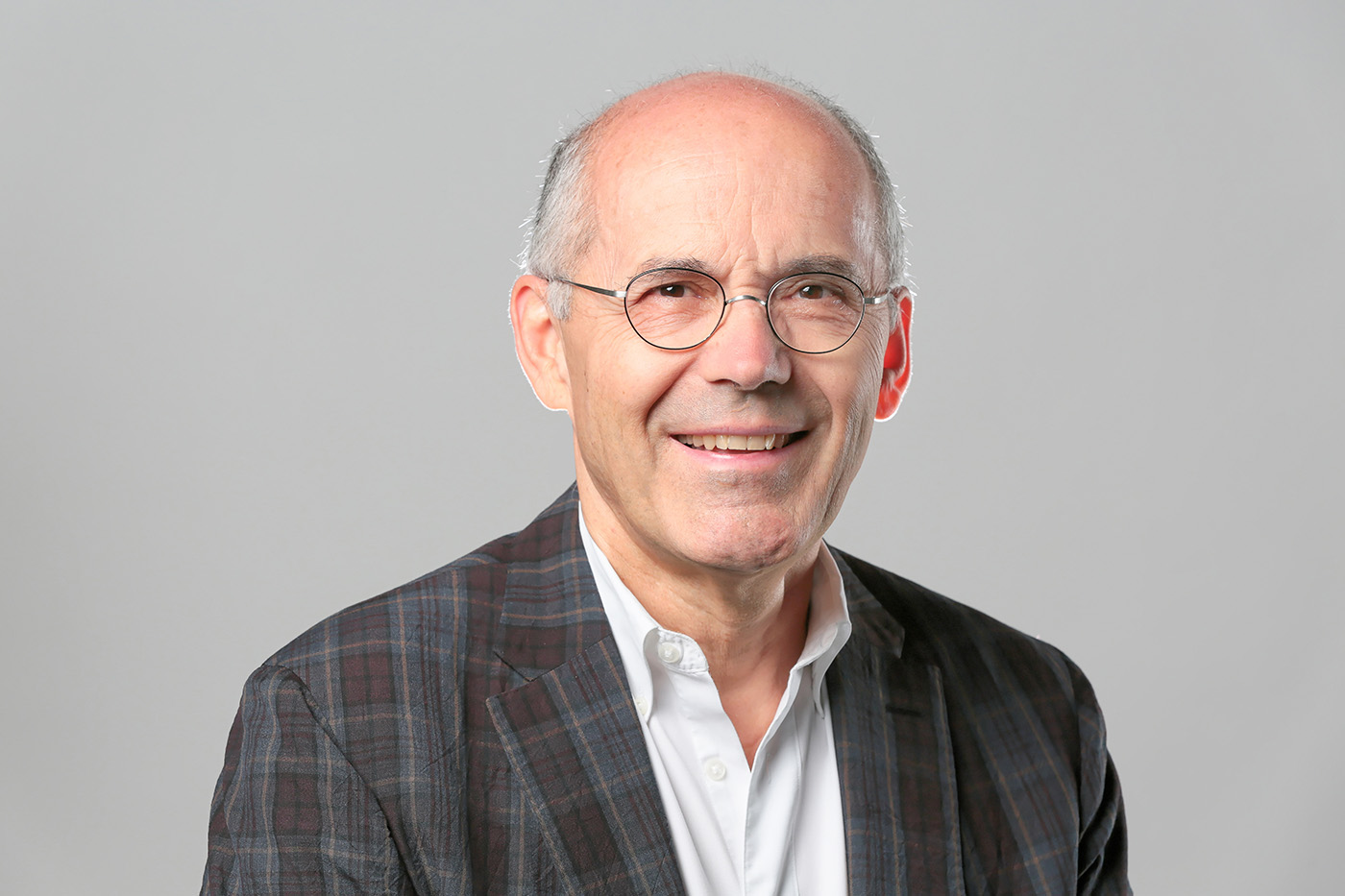
- Meylan
- Born: 31 July 1950 (age 75); Lausanne, Switzerland
- Occupation: Astronomer

Georges Meylan is a Swiss astronomer, born on July 31, 1950, in Lausanne, Switzerland. He was the director of the Laboratory of Astrophysics of the Swiss Federal Institute of Technology (EPFL) in Lausanne, Switzerland, and now a professor emeritus of astrophysics and cosmology at EPFL. He is still active in both research and teaching.

== Biography ==
Georges Meylan was born on July 31, 1950., in Lausanne, Switzerland, where he attended primary school. He then started his higher education with the Special Mathematics Course at the Swiss Federal Institute of Technology in Lausanne (Ecole Polytechnique Fédérale de Lausanne - EPFL), followed by a master of mathematical sciences, specializing in pure mathematics and fundamental research, at the University of Lausanne.

He then went to the University of Geneva for post-graduate studies in physics, where he obtained a master in astrophysics and astronomy. In the same institution, in 1985, he completed his PhD thesis devoted to the dynamical study of nearby stellar systems, called globular clusters, through the use of high-quality stellar radial velocities. His PhD advisor was Michel Mayor (Nobel Prize in Physics in 2019).

Georges Meylan benefited from two postdoctoral positions, first, at the Astronomy Department of the University of California at Berkeley, CA, US, and, second, in the Scientific Group at the Headquarters of the European Southern Observatory in Munich, Germany. He then occupied positions as senior astronomer at the Space Telescope Science Institute, in Baltimore, MD, US and at the Headquarters of the European Southern Observatory in Munich, Germany. From 1999 to 2012, he was a Visiting Associate in the Division of Physics, Mathematics, and Astronomy at the California Institute of Technology (Caltech) in Pasadena, CA, US.

From 2004 to 2015, Georges Meylan was a professor of Astrophysics and Cosmology at the Swiss Federal Institute of Technology (EPFL) in Lausanne, Switzerland, and, simultaneously, the director of the EPFL Laboratory of Astrophysics. Since September 2015, he is a professor emeritus at EPFL, still active in research and in teaching, both at EPFL and at the University of Lausanne.

== Professional responsibilities ==
Since the year of his PhD Thesis (1985), Georges Meylan has been asked to referee numerous papers submitted to the main astronomical journals (Nature, Astronomy & Astrophysics, Astrophysical Journal, Astronomical Journal, Monthly Notices of the RAS). He refereed numerous proposals from the National Science Foundation (NSF, US) and from the Swiss National Science Foundation (SNSF, Switzerland), among other similar national grant systems in Europe, US, and Asia. He was also a member of various refereeing processes, such as the Hubble Space Telescope Time allocation Committee (TAC) and the ESO Observing Programmes Committee (OPC). He organized about ten international conferences with the publications of their proceedings. He also organized a Saas Fee Course on gravitational lensing with the publication of the related book.

In addition, Georges Meylan was, in the framework of the International Astronomical Union (IAU), President of Commission 37 Star Clusters & Associations (2000-2003) and President of Division VII Galactic System (2000-2003), and then Advisor (2003-2006) to the same entities. He was president (2008-2015) of the Commission for Astronomy of the Swiss Academy of Sciences and was the scientific delegate for Switzerland on the ESO Council (2008-2014). During about the same period (2008-2016), he was a panel member and then panel chair in the framework for the European Research Council (ERC) in Brussels. From 2016 until 2022, he was a member of the Council of the European Astronomical Society (EAS). From 2016 to 2023, he chaired the Board of Trustees of the International Space Science Institute (ISSI) in Bern, Switzerland. He is a member of the Academia Europea.

== Scientific Interests ==
Georges Meylan has contributed significantly to two main fields of research in astrophysics and cosmology. First, he studied the internal stellar kinematics and dynamics of globular clusters, which are stellar systems containing from a few 10^{5} to a few 10^{6} stars. Second, he investigated the effect of gravitational lensing on distant galaxies and quasars induced by intervening galaxies and clusters of galaxies along the line of sight. Gravitational lensing is nowadays a genuine tool allowing the determination of some fundamental cosmological parameters, such as the Hubble constant H_{0} , related to the age of the Universe, and Ω_{m}, and Ω_{Λ} , which are, respectively, the fraction of matter (Baryonic and Dark Matter) and the fraction of Dark Energy in the Universe.

While at EPFL, he has initiated two long-term scientific programs. First, COSMOGRAIL for the monitoring of light curves of the images of gravitationally lensed quasars, second, he involved Switzerland in the ESA satellite mission EUCLID, which will investigate the nature of Dark Energy and Dark Matter, the two main constituents of our Universe.

Here after are some highlights of his main research achievements, which have been published in more than 300 refereed papers :

- First extensive study of the presence of internal systemic rotation in two globular clusters, namely, ω Centauri and 47 Tucanae, through 2-D and 3-D investigations of their rotation fields.
- First application to the globular cluster ω Centauri of multi-mass anisotropic King-Michie dynamical models.
- Discovery of the first tight pair of quasars, at a redshift z = 1.345, separated by 4.2 arcsec in projection, corresponding to a physical separation distance of 25 kpc.
- Discovery of a new gravitational lens candidate, associated with the quasar UM 425 = QSO 1120+019.
- Discovery of two high-velocity stars shot out of the core of the globular cluster 47 Tucanae.
- First dynamical mapping in the core of a collapsed globular cluster, namely, M15.
- Spectroscopic identification providing the long awaited redshift measurement of the heavily obscured, gravitationally lensed radio source PKS 1830-211, which was first observed as a radio Einstein ring.
- First detection of tidal tails around globulars clusters.
- First extensive dynamical study of an extragalactic globular cluster, viz., Mayall II ~ G1, one of the brightest, most massive globular clusters, belonging to M31, the Andromeda galaxy.
- First detection of weak gravitational shear at infrared wavelengths, using observations of the lensing cluster Abell 1689, taken with the SOFI camera on the ESO-NTT telescope.
- Discovery of a bright quasar without a massive host galaxy.
- First very high-quality measurements of about 15,000 stellar proper motions in a globular cluster, namely 47 Tucanae, giving access to an unprecedented precise view on the inner stellar dynamics and distance of such a stellar system.
- Discovery of the first physical triple quasar.
- First precise study of microlensing variability in a gravitationally lensed quasar, namely, QSO 2237+0305 = the Einstein Cross.
- Discovery of the first quasar acting as a strong gravitational lens.
- Hubble observations of three quasi-stellar objects acting as strong gravitational lenses.
- Determination of the most precise time-delay measurements in gravitationally lensed quasars, in the framework of the collaborations COSMOGRAIL and H0LiCOW.
- Various interventions and interviews for the Swiss Radio and Television.
