= Smiley =

Stylized image of a smiling face

Example of a smiley face

An example of an emoticon smiley face (represented using a colon followed by a parenthesis) used in direct communication, as seen in this screenshot of an email

A smiley emoji

A smiley, also known as a smiley face, is a basic ideogram representing a smiling face. Since the 1950s, it has become part of popular culture worldwide, used either as a standalone ideogram or as a form of communication, such as emoticons. The smiley began as two dots and a line representing eyes and a mouth. More elaborate designs emerged in the 1950s, featuring noses, eyebrows, and outlines. New York radio station WMCA used a yellow and black design for its "Good Guys!" campaign in the early 1960s. More yellow-and-black designs appeared in the 1960s and 1970s, including works by Harvey Ross Ball in 1963, and Franklin Loufrani in 1971. The Smiley Company, founded by Franklin Loufrani, claims to hold the rights to a version of the smiley face in over 100 countries. It has become one of the top 100 licensing companies globally.

There was a widespread "smile face" fad in the United States in 1971. A July 1971 Asbury Park Press report described the happy face as a nationwide craze, noting that retailers were stocking dozens of products from many different manufacturers, that no one held a trademark, and that the design’s origins were unclear, with some attributing it to earlier WMCA "Good Guys" sweatshirts. The Associated Press (AP) ran a wirephoto showing Joy P. Young and Harvey Ball holding the design of the smiley and reported on September 11, 1971, that "two affiliated insurance companies" credited Harvey Ball with designing the symbol in 1963, while Bernard and Murray Spain claimed credit for introducing it to the market. This referred to the Worcester Mutual Fire Insurance Company of America and the Guarantee Mutual Assurance Company of America, whose 1963 "Smile Power" campaign first distributed smiley buttons to employees. In October 1971, Loufrani trademarked his design in France while working as a journalist for the French newspaper France-Soir.

Today, the smiley face has evolved from an ideogram into a template for communication and use in written language. The internet smiley originated with Scott Fahlman in the 1980s, when he first theorized that ASCII characters could be used to create faces and convey emotions in text. Since then, Fahlman's designs have become digital pictograms known as emoticons. They are loosely based on the ideograms designed in the 1960s and 1970s, continuing with the yellow and black design.

== Etymology ==
The word smiley likely originated as a surname in Lanarkshire, Scotland. During this historical period, surnames evolved from medieval nicknames, with "smiley" describing a person with a cheerful nature. The earliest recorded Smiley surname is Thomas Smiley. Born in Derry, Northern Ireland in 1660 as a Williamite military figure, he likely descended from 17th-century Scottish migrants from Lanarkshire who settled during the Plantation of Ulster.

The use of smiley as a noun or noun modifier came much later than the surname, but likely came from the creative or colloquial shortening of smiling to mimic spoken dialect. In 1957, author Jane McHenry used it as a noun in Family Weekly magazine when he wrote, "Draw a big smiley face on the plate!" A year later, there was an illustration of a noseless smiling face containing two dots, eyebrows, and a single curved line for a mouth in a write-up in Family Weekly, Galloping Ghosts! by Bill Ross.

The term "Smiley" was used by Franklin Loufrani in France when he registered his design for trademark protection while working as a journalist for France-Soir in 1971. The smiley accompanied positive news in the newspaper and eventually became the foundation for The Smiley Company.

== History of smiling faces ==
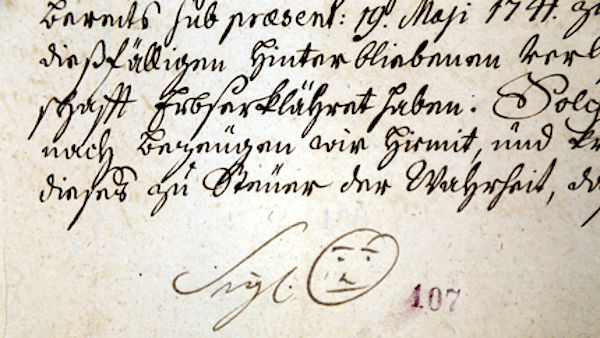
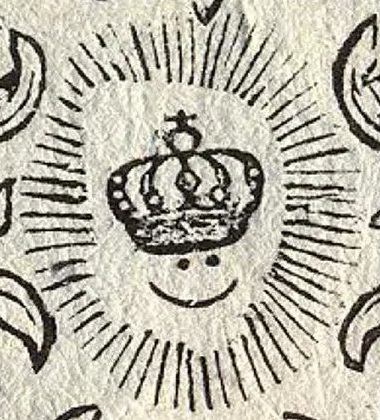

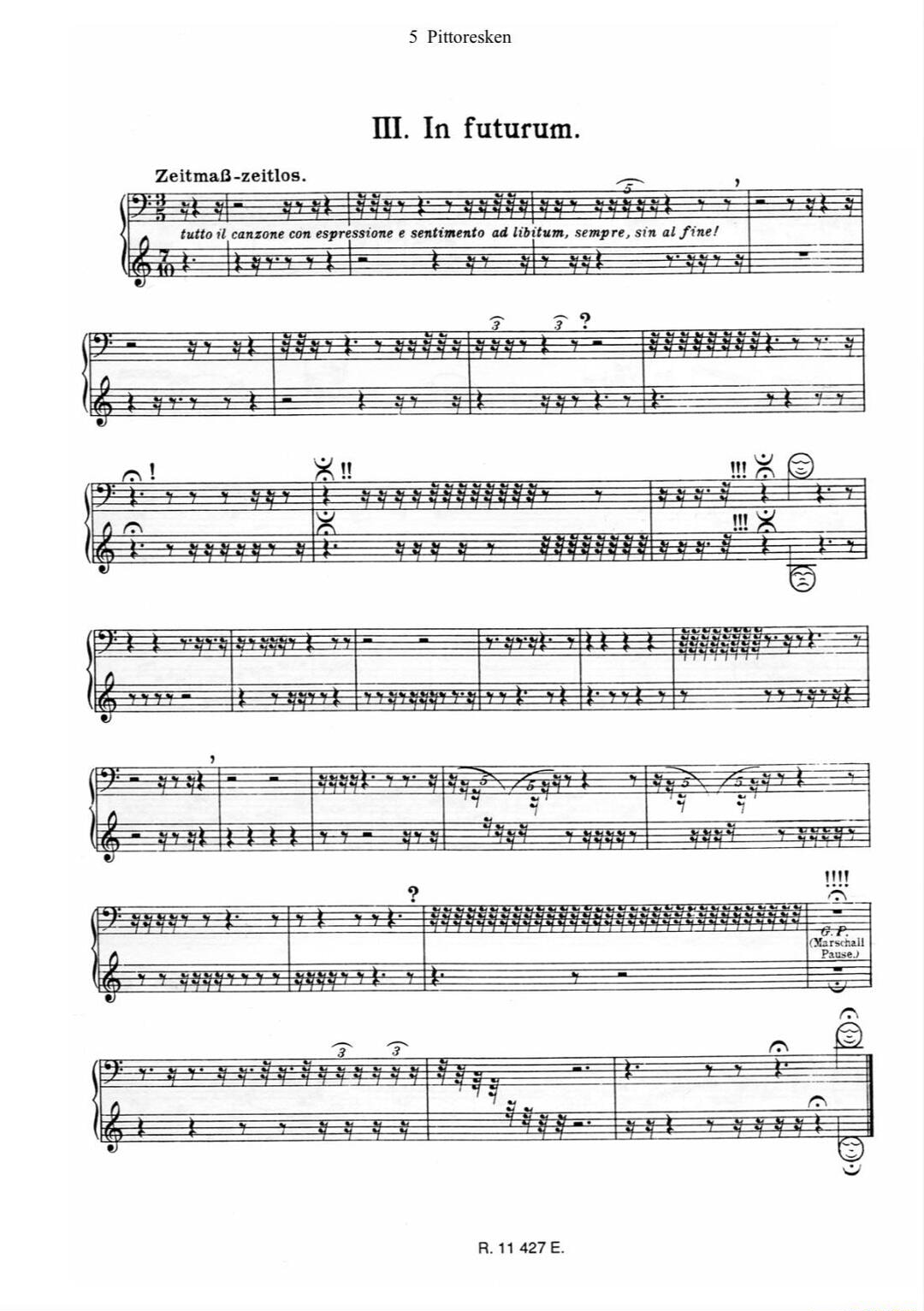
Page from the score of Erwin Schulhoff's "In Futurum" (one of his "Fünf Pittoresken") includes smiley faces

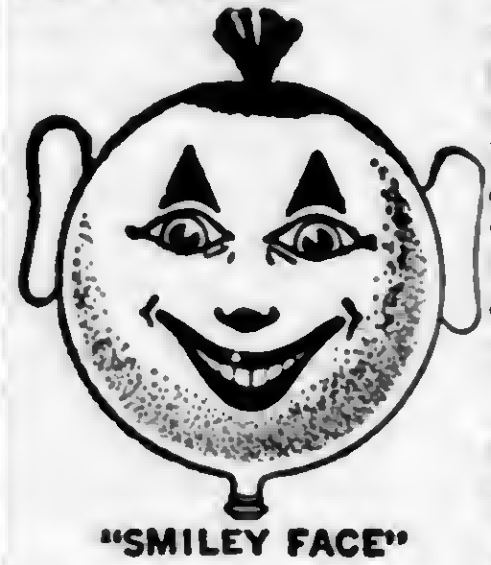
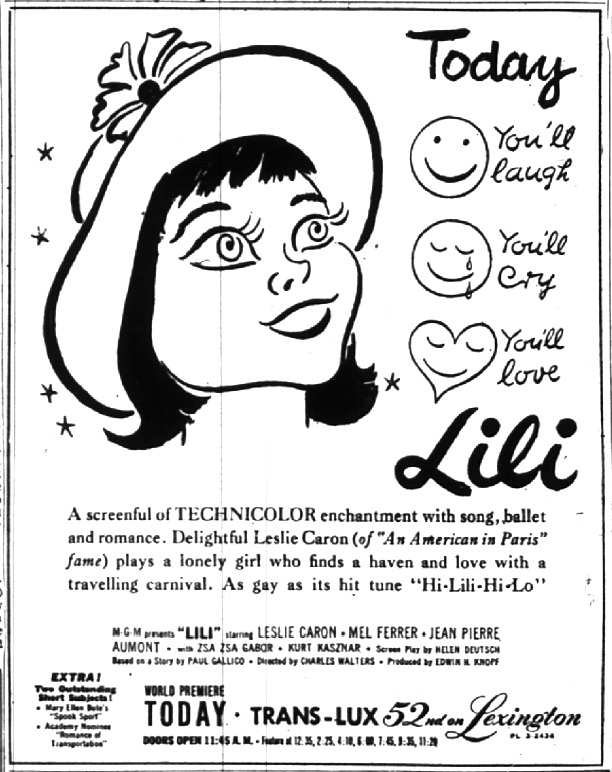

=== Early history ===
The oldest known smiling face was found by a team of archaeologists led by Nicolò Marchetti of the University of Bologna. Marchetti and his team pieced together fragments of a Hittite pot, dating back to approximately 1700 BC, found in Karkamış, Turkey. Once the pot had been pieced together, the team noticed that the item had a large smiling face engraved on it, becoming the earliest artifact with such a design to be found.

=== Early to mid 20th century ===
The score of Erwin Schulhoff's "In Futurum" (the middle movement of his "Fünf Pittoresken", published in 1919) includes smiling and sad faces. In the 1930s, American corporations began to experiment with smiling faces in advertising. One such company was Chevrolet, who at the time had a heated rivalry with Ford and launched the 1931 campaign "Keep Your Eye on Chevrolet". They used pinback buttons as part of this campaign, which featured a yellow happy face character, which looks remarkably similar to modern day emoticons as it isn't smiling but is winking and has expression on its face.

Also in the 1930s, an eccentric Depression-era tramp was popularly dubbed "Santa Claus Smith". He identified himself as John S. Smith of Riga, Latvia, Europe. He wandered across the United States, giving hand-scrawled checks for extravagant sums to people who showed him small kindnesses, such as meals, coffee, or lifts. His checks were written in indelible pencil on scraps of brown wrapping paper. They typically featured a crude smiling-face doodle—two dots for eyes, a dot for a nose, and a curved line for a mouth. His idiosyncratic handwriting often included the misspelling of "thousand" Contemporary documentation of his checks and the doodled smile can be found in bank correspondence reviewed for Joseph Mitchell’s 1940 profile. Later historical accounts have highlighted the episode as an early cultural appearance of a smile motif in the United States.

Ingmar Bergman's 1948 film Port of Call features a scene where the unhappy Berit (played by Nine-Christine Jönsson) draws a sad face – closely resembling the modern "frowny" face but with a dot for the nose – in lipstick on her mirror before being interrupted. In September 1963, there was the premiere of The Funny Company, an American children's TV program, which had a noseless Smiling face used as a kids' club logo; the closing credits ended with the message, "Keep Smiling!"

In the latter half of the 20th century, the face now known as a smiley evolved into a well-known symbol recognizable for its yellow and black features. The first known combination of yellow and black was used for a smiling face in late 1962, when New York City radio station WMCA released a yellow sweatshirt as part of a marketing campaign. By 1963, over 11,000 sweatshirts had been given away. They had featured in Billboard magazine, and numerous celebrities had also been pictured wearing them, including the actress Patsy King and the singer Mick Jagger. The radio station used the happy face as part of a competition for listeners. When the station called listeners, any listener who answered their phone with "WMCA Good Guys!" was rewarded with a "WMCA Good Guys!" sweatshirt that incorporated the yellow and black happy face into its design. The features of the WMCA smiley were a yellow face, with black dots as eyes, and a slightly crooked smile. The outline of the face was also not smooth, giving it a more hand-drawn look. Originally, the yellow and black sweatshirt (sometimes referred to as gold), had WMCA Good Guys! written on the front with no smiley face.

=== Harvey Ball design ===
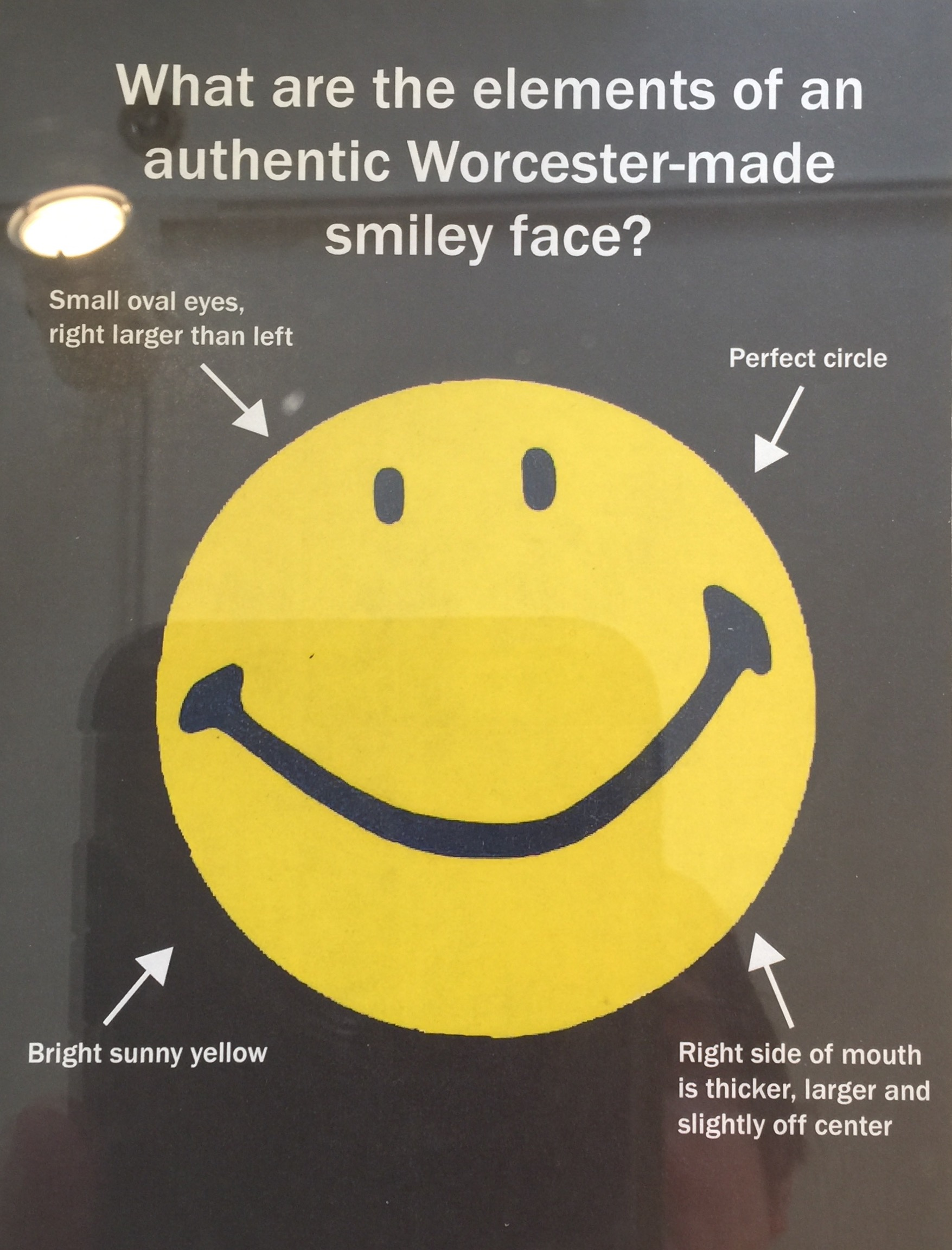
"Authentic Worcester-made smiley face", by Harvey Ball

A number of United States–based designs of yellow and black happy faces emerged over the next decade. State Mutual Life Assurance Company in Worcester, Massachusetts, wanted to raise the morale of its staff following a merger with another insurance company. Company Vice President John Adam, Jr., suggested a "friendship campaign". He assigned Joy Young, Assistant Director of Sales and Marketing, to lead the project. According to Worcester Historical Museum's documents, Young requested that Harvey Ball, a freelance artist, design "a little smile to be used on buttons, desk cards and posters". Ball completed the happy face in ten minutes and was paid $45 (equivalent to $473 in 2025). His rendition, with a bright yellow background, dark oval eyes, a full smile, and creases at the sides of the mouth, became familiar worldwide as the most iconic version of the smiley. In response to queries why he had not trademarked the button design, Adam said: "We never intended to keep the smile to ourselves—we want everyone to smile and to keep smiling and to remind them that that is our first goal in serving our customers—keep 'em smiling!"

In 1967, George Tanagi, a Seattle graphic artist, drew his own version at the request of advertising agent David Stern. Tanagi's design was used in a Seattle-based University Federal Savings & Loan advertising campaign. Stern, who ran for mayor in Seattle in 1993, took credit for inventing the smiley face, saying he was inspired by the song "Put on a Happy Face" in Bye Bye Birdie.

The Philadelphia-based brothers Bernard and Murray Spain, after coming across the design in a button shop, appropriated it for novelty items for their business, Traffic Stoppers. They added the slogan "Have a happy day" (or "Have a nice day") and copyrighted this version. Though they believed that they could have gone to court to prevent other businesses from copying the smile alone, they said they would only do so if these businesses were "degrading the smile". They sold other manufacturers’ smile products alongside their own, reasoning that these "just enhance our own products". The Spain brothers expanded their business rapidly, producing over 50 million buttons with New York button manufacturer NG Slater.

=== The Smiley Company ===
In 1972, Frenchman Franklin Loufrani trademarked a version of a smiley face similar to Ball's design. He used it to highlight the good news parts of the newspaper France Soir. He simply called the design "Smiley" and launched The Smiley Company. In 1996, Nicolas Loufrani, the son of Franklin Loufrani, took over the family business and built it into a multinational corporation. Nicolas Loufrani was outwardly skeptical of Ball's claim to have created the first smiley face, arguing that the design is so simple that no one person can claim to have created it. As evidence for this, The Smiley Company's website cited what they called "the first human representation of the Smiley logo", a Neolithic stone shaped like a button found in a cave in Nimes. They also pointed to the use of a smiley face in the 1960 WMCA ad campaign, and mentioned the "smiley badge" of the State Mutual Life Insurance Company, without naming its designer.

This "History" section of the website has since been removed. The about page, under the heading "Where It All Began", now reads:

"Paris, France - A young journalist named Franklin Loufrani had a stroke of invention... [he] decided to design a campaign that would highlight positive stories to readers. His idea? A smiling yellow face next to all positive news and on fun products to spread the campaign in every home and public space."

The Smiley Company claims to own trademark rights to some version of the smiley face in about one hundred countries. Its subsidiary, SmileyWorld Ltd, in London, headed by Nicolas Loufrani, creates or approves all of the licensed Smiley products sold in countries where it holds the trademark. The Smiley brand and logo have significant exposure through licensees in various sectors, including clothing, home decoration, perfumery, plush, stationery, and publishing, as well as through promotional campaigns. The Smiley Company is one of the 100 top licensing companies in the world, with a 2012 turnover of US$167 million. The first Smiley shop opened in London in the Boxpark shopping center in December 2011. In 2022, there were many birthday celebrations for the smiley. Many of these came in the form of collaborations between The Smiley Company and large retailers, such as Nordstrom.

== Language and communication ==
The earliest known smiling face to be included in a written document was drawn by a Slovak notary to indicate his satisfaction with the state of his town's municipal financial records in 1635. The gold smiling face was drawn on the bottom of the legal document, appearing next to lawyer Jan Ladislaides' signature. The Danish poet and author Johannes V. Jensen was famous for experimenting with the form of his writing, amongst other things. In a letter sent to publisher Ernst Bojesen in December 1900, he includes both a happy and a sad face. It was in the 1900s that the design evolved from a basic eye and mouth design into a more recognizable design.

A disputed early use of a smiling ASCII emoticon in a printed text may have been in Robert Herrick's poem To Fortune (1648), which contains the line "Upon my ruins (smiling yet :)". Journalist Levi Stahl has suggested that this may have been an intentional "orthographic joke". However, this occurrence is likely merely the colon placed inside parentheses rather than outside of them, as is standard typographic practice today: "(smiling yet):". There are citations of similar punctuation in a non-humorous context, even within Herrick's own work. It is likely that the parenthesis was added later by modern editors.

On the Internet, emojis have become a visual means of conveyance that uses images. The first known mention on the Internet was on 19 September 1982, when Scott Fahlman from Carnegie Mellon University wrote:

I propose that the following character sequence for joke markers:
        
:-)
        
Read it sideways.  Actually, it is probably more economical to mark
things that are NOT jokes, given current trends.  For this, use
        
:-(

The digital evolution of the smiley into online communication began in the late 1990s with its incorporation into early emoticons and instant messaging systems. Yahoo! Messenger (from 1998) used smiley symbols in the user list next to each user, and also as an icon for the application. By the early 2000s, instant messaging platforms such as MSN Messenger and Yahoo! Messenger were introducing official toolbars that allowed users to send pictographic icons. Microsoft’s 2004 beta of MSN Messenger 7, for instance, included "special emoticons, the smiley faces and other icons that indicate emotions". Prior to such official integrations, third-party "smiley toolbars" and plug-ins were already widely used. One example is the "SmileyWorld" toolbar developed by Nicolas Loufrani, which the Smiley Company claims drew inspiration from its earlier "Smiley Dictionary" of icons, although these claims primarily derive from the company's own promotional materials. Independent reporting distinguishes between "emoticons", which are text-based symbols popularized in the 1980s, and "emoji", which originated with NTT DoCoMo in Japan in the late 1990s.

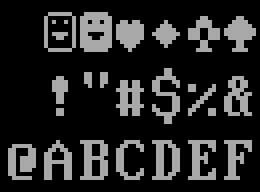
Smiley faces from DOS code page 437

The smiley is the printable version of characters 1 and 2 of (black-and-white versions of) codepage 437 (1981) of the first IBM PC and all subsequent PC compatible computers. For modern computers, all versions of Microsoft Windows after Windows 95 can use the smiley as part of Windows Glyph List 4, although some computer fonts miss some characters. The smiley face was included in Unicode's Miscellaneous Symbols from version 1.1 (1993).

Unicode smiley characters:
☺	U+263A	Alt+1	White Smiling Face (This may appear as an emoji on some devices)
☻	U+263B	Alt+2	Black Smiling Face
Miscellaneous Symbols also contains the frowning face:
☹	U+2639		White Frowning Face

Later additions to Unicode included a large number of variants expressing a range of human emotions, in particular with the addition of the "Emoticons" and "Supplemental Symbols and Pictographs blocks in Unicode versions 6.0 (2010) and 8.0 (2015), respectively. These were introduced for compatibility with the ad-hoc implementation of emoticons by Japanese telephone carriers in unused ranges of the Shift JIS standard. This resulted in a de facto standard in the range with lead bytes 0xF5 to 0xF9.KDDI has gone much further than this, introducing hundreds more in the space with lead bytes 0xF3 and 0xF4.

Recent studies have investigated how various demographic factors influence individuals' interpretations and representations of smiley faces. A notable study by Clarke et al. (2018) involved an observational study with 723 participants who were "asked to draw a smiley face for themselves" to examine the impact of gender and age on the way individuals depict smiley faces upon prompting. The findings revealed significant disparities: women and younger participants (aged 30 or younger) were more inclined to illustrate traditional smiley faces, characterized by simple designs that primarily include eyes and a mouth, often excluding additional features such as noses or outlines. These results highlight the presence of demographic biases in the interpretation and depiction of smiley faces, underscoring the need for careful consideration of these factors in research and surveys that utilize smileys or similar facial symbols, particularly those that rely on self-reported outcomes or scales incorporating facial images to denote emotional or evaluative states.

smiling face
:)

winking face
;)

surprised face
:O

confused face
:/
sad face
:(

crying face
:'(

grinning face
:D

kissing face
:*

== In popular culture ==
=== United States advertising campaigns ===
The smiley face of Sabritas named Oscar, having an open mouth.

Different designs were used in advertising campaigns in the early to mid-20th century. Much of this activity was centered on the Northeastern United States. One of the first known commercial uses of a smiling face was in 1919, when the Buffalo Steam Roller Company in Buffalo, New York, applied stickers on receipts with the word "thanks" and a smiling face above it. The face contained a lot of detail, with eyebrows, a nose, teeth, a chin, and facial creases reminiscent of "man-in-the-Moon" style characteristics. Another early commercial use of a smiling face was in 1922 when the Gregory Rubber Company of Akron, Ohio, ran an ad for "smiley face" balloons in The Billboard. This happy face had hair, a nose, teeth, pie eyes, and triangles over the eyes. In 1953 and 1958, similar happy faces were used in promotional campaigns for the films Lili (1953) and Gigi (1958).

Happy faces in the northeastern United States, and later in the entire country, became a "common theme" within advertising circles from the 1960s onwards. This rose to prominence during the 1960s and was remixed and interpreted in different ways up until the 1980s. There were sporadic designs of smiling faces or happy faces before this, but it wasn't until the WMCA in the early 1960s used yellow and black that the theme became more commonplace. Walmart uses a smiley face as its mascot.

=== In print ===
In the United States, there were many instances of smiling faces in the 1900s. However, the first industry to widely adopt the smiley was the comics and cartoons sector. Franklin Loufrani used the word smiley when he designed a smiling face for the newspaper he was working for at the time. The Loufrani design emerged in 1971, when Loufrani created a smiley face for the newspaper France-Soir. The newspaper used Loufrani's smiley to highlight stories that they defined as "feel-good news" This particular smiley went on to form The Smiley Company. Mad magazine notably used the smiley face a year later, in 1972, across its entire front page for the April edition of the magazine. This was one of the first instances in which the smiling face had been adapted, with one of the twenty visible smileys pulling a face.

In the DC Comics, shady businessman "Boss Smiley" (a political boss with a smiley face for a head) makes several appearances. The logo for and cover of the omnibus edition of the Watchmen comic book series features a smiley badge worn by the character, the Comedian, with blood splattered on it from the murder that initiates the events of the story. In 2022, Assouline published "50 Years of Good News", a comprehensive examination of the cultural development of the smiley face and its widespread use.

=== Music and film ===
As music genres began to develop their own cultures from the 1970s onwards, many cultures started incorporating a smiling face into their culture. In the late 1970s, the American band Dead Kennedys launched their first recording, "California Über Alles". The single cover was a collage intended to resemble a Nazi rally prior to World War II. It featured three of the vertical banners commonly used at such rallies, but with the usual swastikas replaced by large smileys.

The Watchmen comic series logo

In the UK, the happy face has been associated with psychedelic culture since the Ubi Dwyer and the Windsor Free Festival in the 1970s, as well as with electronic dance music culture, particularly with acid house, which emerged during the Second Summer of Love in the late 1980s. The association was cemented when the band Bomb the Bass used an extracted smiley from the comic book series Watchmen on the center of its "Beat Dis" hit single. In addition to the movie adaptation of Watchmen, the film Suicide Squad has the character Deadshot staring into the window of a clothing store. Behind a line of mannequins is a yellow smiley face pin, which had been closely associated with another DC comic character, the Comedian.

In the late 1980s, the smiley again became a prominent image within the music industry. It was adopted during the growth of acid house across Europe and the UK in the late 1980s. According to many, this began when DJ Danny Rampling used the smiley to celebrate Paul Oakenfold's birthday. This sparked a movement in which the smiley face moved into various dance genres, becoming a symbol of 1980s dance music.

In the 1994 film Forrest Gump, it is implied that the titular character inspired the smiley face design after wiping his face on a T-shirt while running across the country. The 2001 film Evolution features a three-eyed smiley face as its logo. It was later carried over to the movie's spin-off cartoon, Alienators: Evolution Continues. In 2022, David Guetta collaborated with Felix Da Housecat and Kittin to release the song, Silver Screen, a reimagined version of the 2001 dance track. Guetta's version celebrated positivity and happiness. The music video features a cameo from street artist André Saraiva and portrays different groups portraying the message "Take The Time To Smile". The video partners that message with numerous smileys, on the sides of buildings, on placards, and on posters.

=== Physical products ===
Vittel announced in 2017 that it would be using the smiley on a special edition design of its water bottles. AdAge referred to its use as a "feel-good effect", and water bottles featuring the smiley icon had an 11.8% increase in sales compared to standard bottles, with 128 million bottles sold across Europe that bore the smiley design. In China, there has been a steady growth in the use of smileys in its culture, both as a physical brand and also digitally. This rise in popularity has led to the opening of numerous smiley merchandise stores in the country. By the end of 2024, 15 stores had opened in the country in cities such as Guangzhou, Suzhou, and Xiamen. It was expected that the number could top 50 stores by the end of 2027. Other countries in Asia were also experiencing a similar boom, including Thailand, where three stores opened in 2024.

=== Art and fashion ===
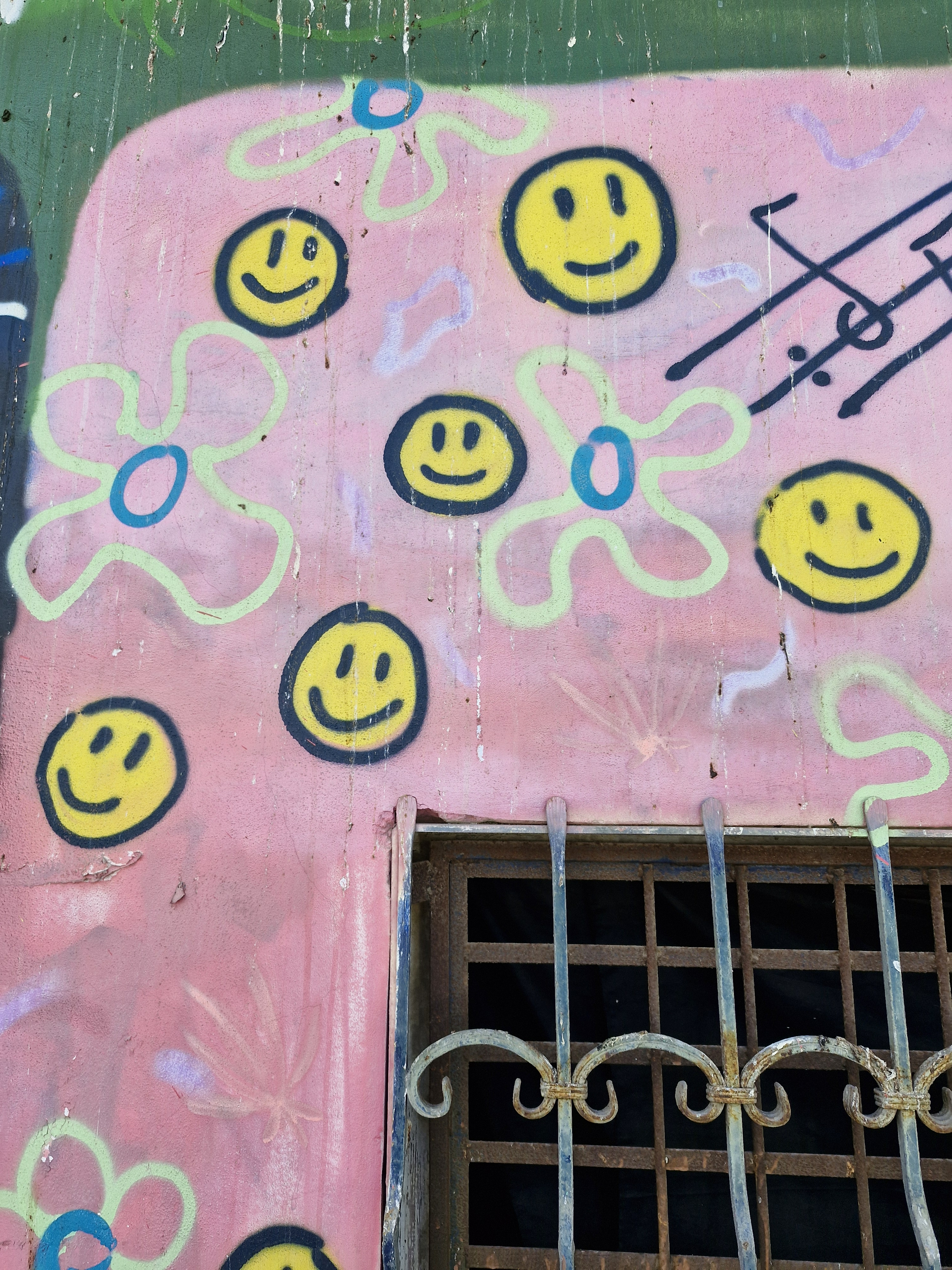
Smilies in Tel Aviv street art

As part of his early works, anti-consumerist graffiti artist Banksy frequently incorporated the smiley face into his art. The first of his major works that included a smiley was his Flying Copper portrait, which was completed in 2004. It was during a period when Banksy experimented with creating portraits on canvas and paper. He also used the smiley in 2005 to replace the Grim Reaper's face. The image became known as "grin reaper" In 2007, The Smiley Company partnered with Moschino for the campaign "Smiley for Moschino."

During the COVID-19 pandemic, fashion label Pull & Bear announced they would be releasing t-shirts with a smiley design incorporated on the front. Other fashion labels that have used the smiley on their garments include H&M and Zara. The smiley has also featured on high-end fashion lines, including Fendi and Moncler. High-end French jeweller Valerie Messika produced white gold and yellow pendants, which contained a smiley face. For the 50th birthday of the Smiley, Galeries Lafayette in Paris, Beijing, and Shanghai, as well as 10 Nordstrom department stores, sold limited-edition smiley products to commemorate the anniversary. During the same year, Lee Jeans announced the launch of a new clothing collection, Lee x Smiley.

=== Gaming ===
In 1980, Namco released the now-famous Pac-Man, a yellow-faced cartoon character. In 2008, the video game Battlefield: Bad Company featured a yellow smiley as part of its branding. The smiley appeared throughout the game and also on the cover. The smiley normally appeared on the side of a grenade, which became synonymous with the Battlefield series.

The 1987 Atari ST game MIDI Maze, released on other platforms as Faceball 2000, features round, yellow Smileys as enemies. When a player is eliminated, these enemies taunt the player with the phrase "Have a nice day". The Pokémon Ditto is based on the smiley face. Game Freak's staff described Ditto as "the weirdest Pokémon" in the franchise. In 2026, the smiley became associated with an internet meme surrounding the Minecraft horror web series Verity, in which the titular antagonist is a yellow smiley face character.

=== Events ===
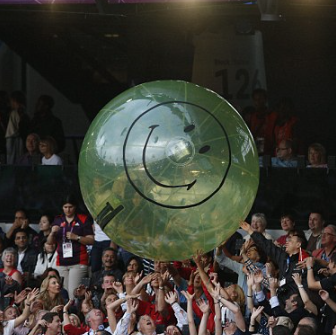
Smiley ball at London 2012 Olympics

In recent times, the smiley has been used as a symbol for happiness or to spread joy in public places or at various events. One recorded example of this was at the London 2012 opening ceremony. Balls were released into the crowd as the show began. The balls were large but light enough that members of the crowd could use them like a beach ball, with each ball containing a large black smiley face on one side.

A smiley was projected onto the base of the Brooklyn Bridge in July 2020 "to cheer up New Yorkers". The 82-foot-wide projected smiley featured light pink lipstick on the mouth of the smiley. In 2022, the International Day of Happiness was celebrated by projecting a smiley onto a number of landmarks around the globe. In Seoul, South Korea, a smiley celebrating happiness was projected onto the Seoul Tower.

=== Social sciences ===
User experience researchers have shown that the use of smileys to represent answer scales may ease the challenges related to translation and implementation for brief cross-cultural surveys. The Simple Measure of Impact of Lupus Erythematosus in Youngsters (SMILEY) was translated and culturally adapted into multiple language variants, including Danish, Dutch, French, German, Hebrew, Italian, Portuguese, Spanish, and Turkish.

== Claim of ownership and trademark disputes ==
In 1997, Franklin Loufrani attempted to trademark the ideogram he created in the United States. Walmart contested his application, as it began using a similar graphic for its "Rolling Back Prices" campaign a year prior. The fallout led to a 2002 court case that lasted more than a decade before a settlement was reached. Despite that, Walmart sued an online parodist for alleged "trademark infringement" after he used the symbol. The District Court found in favor of the parodist when, in March 2008, the judge concluded that Walmart's smiley face logo was not shown to be "inherently distinctive" and that it "has failed to establish that the smiley face has acquired secondary meaning or that it is otherwise a protectable trademark" under U.S. law. In June 2010, Walmart and The Smiley Company founded by Loufrani settled their 10-year-old dispute in front of the Chicago federal court. The terms remain confidential. In 2016, Walmart reintroduced the smiley face on its website, social media profiles, and in select stores.

The band Nirvana created its own smiley design in 1991. It was claimed that Kurt Cobain designed the Nirvana smiley. In 2020, media reports suggested that a Los Angeles–based freelance designer was, in fact, behind the designs. Fashion house Marc Jacobs designed a smiley in 2018, which had a yellow outline, with the letters M and J replacing the eyes. The mouth design was similar to the Nirvana design. In January 2019, legal representatives of Nirvana announced they were suing Marc Jacobs for a breach of copyright. Following the announcement by a judge in Los Angeles that the suit could move forward, Marc Jacobs announced a countersuit against Nirvana. In 2020, a Los Angeles–based designer claimed to be the creator of the Nirvana smiley and thus became an intervenor in the case between Nirvana and Marc Jacobs.

== See also ==
- Acid2
- Body language
- Facial Action Coding System
- Galle (Martian crater)
- Henohenomoheji
- Kolobok
- Mr. Yuk
- Pac-Man (character)
- Pareidolia
- Red John
- SDSS J1038+4849
- Social intelligence
