= PHL 1222 =

Quasar in the constellation of Pisces

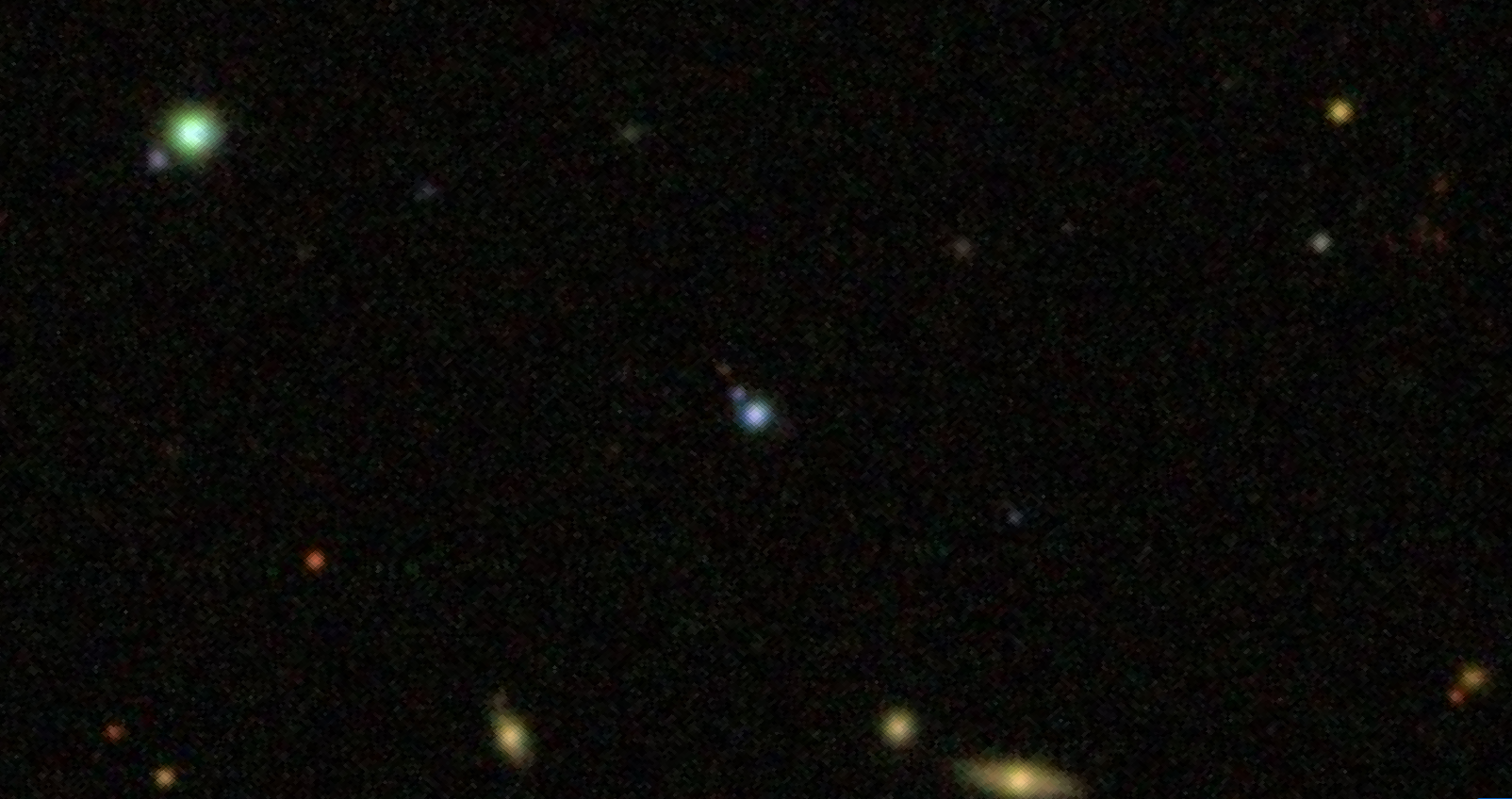
- SDSS image of PHL 1222

Observation data (J2000.0 epoch)
- Constellation: Pisces
- Right ascension: 01^{h} 53^{m} 53.89^{s}
- Declination: +05° 02′ 57.13″
- Redshift: 1.896000
- Heliocentric radial velocity: 568,407 km/s
- Distance: 9.994 Gly
- Apparent magnitude (V): 17.63
- Apparent magnitude (B): 18.04

Characteristics
- Type: RQQ

Other designations
- UM 144, 0151+048, WISEA J015353.89+050257.1, PGC 7032, 2MASS J01535392+0502566, [WMF2001] 03

PHL 1222 also known as Q0151+048 or UM 144, is a radio-quiet binary quasar located in the constellation of Pisces. The quasar has a redshift of (z) 1.91 and was first discovered in January 1990 by astronomers Georges Meylan, Peter Shaver and Stanislav Djorgovski.

== Description ==
PHL 1222 is described having V-band magnitudes of 17.6 and 21.25 respectively. When observed, the quasars are separated into two individual components. One of the components (B) is shown to have a flat continuum while the other (A), has continuum colors described changing from blue to red with its flux level twice as high. It is suggested PHL 1222 might be a gravitationally lensed quasar candidate suggested by Meylan, who noticed a few objects encircling the component of the primary quasar, but however based on the continuum differences and the emission line showing widths described larger in the spectra of component B, he and his team concluded they are a quasar pair. According to observations, Meylan also found PHL 1222 is relatively young, with a separation gap of 3.3 arcseconds, estimating around 100,000-300,000 light-years apart. He suggested they might be formed by tidal interactions.

The host galaxy of the primary quasar of the PHL 1222 system is described as extremely luminous according to observations obtained by Nordic Optical Telescope, with A-B magnitudes of -24.0, detected in photometric system bands. It is said to be a massive elliptical galaxy in early evolution stages based on a de Vaucouleurs profile with a star population between 10 and 100 million years old, while the host galaxy of the secondary quasar is found very faint by 3.2 magnitudes. Additionally, the primary quasar host displays extended continuum radio emission described as slight elongated with a position angle of 20° east of north. The supermassive black hole masses for both objects are estimated to be 10^{9.33} and 10^{8.38} M_{☉} with dark matter halo masses measuring to be 10^{33.74} and 10^{13.13} M_{☉} based on correlation trends.

PHL 1222 shows a number of rich absorption line systems in its spectrum. When observed, the absorption line systems are found to be located various redshifts at (z) 1.929, 1.560, 1,618, 1.933 and 1.931, with mini broad absorption cerium lines described as a blend result of four absorption systems lying between 1.65 and 1.66. Further evidence showed there is a striking feature in one of the absorption lines centering at ʎ3567. This absorption line is described as strong, with it splitting into three different components and four sets of closely packed doublets. The first component is described as a Lyman-alpha feature while the other three are magnesium ions. These absorption systems are likely created by either accretion of interstellar medium or ejection of an interstellar cloud from the quasar via radiation pressure.
