= SDSS J0946+1006 =

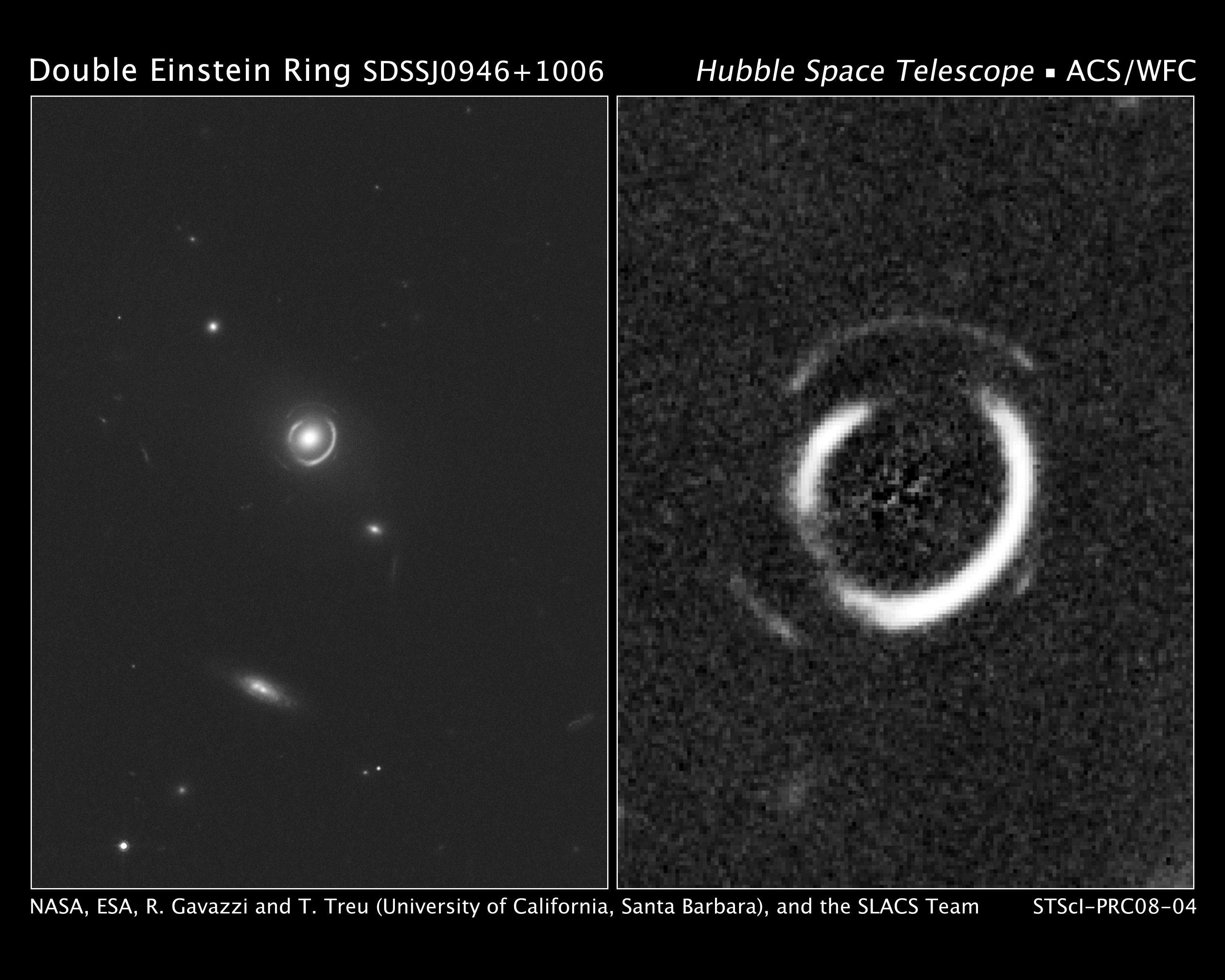
SDSS J0946+1006 gravitational lens

SDSS J0946+1006 is an unusual gravitational lens system consisting of three galaxies at distances of respectively three, six, and eleven billion light years from Earth. In a report presented at the 211th meeting of the American Astronomical Society, researchers Raphael Gavazzi and Tommaso Treu of the University of California, Santa Barbara described the discovery of a double Einstein ring produced by the gravitational lensing of light from two distant galaxies. The observations were made using the Hubble Space Telescope.

The main lens lies at redshift z = 0.222, with the inner ring at z = 0.609 with an Einstein radius R_{E} = 1.43±0.01" and magnitude m = 19.784±0.006, the outer ring is at z ≲ 6.9 with R_{E} = 2.07±0.02" and magnitude m = 23.68±0.09 The lensing galaxy is also known as SDSS J0946+1006 L1, with the nearer lensed galaxy as SDSS J0946+1006 S1, and the farther lensed galaxy SDSS J0946+1006 S2.
