= Graeme Sutherland (internet personality) =

Scottish social media personality

- Born: 25 June 1991; Glasgow, Scotland
- Occupations: TikTok / Social Media Influencer, Alzheimer's Advocate/Ambassador

Graeme Sutherland (born in 1991) of Glasgow, Scotland, is a Scottish TikTok content creator and Alzheimer's awareness advocate. Known as @graemefs online, he has shared videos documenting his mother Linda's battle with Alzheimer's disease. She was diagnosed with early-onset Alzheimer's disease at age 59.

== Early and personal life ==
Sutherland was raised in Erskine, Scotland. He has a twin sister. Their mother, Linda, was diagnosed with Alzheimer's in her late fifties, following years of misdiagnoses that attributed her symptoms to severe depression. This was largely due to the death of her husband Ronald Sutherland, who battled a sudden and short diagnosis of a brain tumour. The siblings became their mother's primary caregivers, balancing this responsibility alongside full-time employment.

He began modelling in 2022 for Colours Agency and has worked with various brands, most notably Celtic F.C and Scottish wedding magazine, Tie the knot Scotland. Though his work modelling is mainly commercial, he is regularly photographed in wedding attire.

Sutherland left his full-time employment at the beginning of 2024 to focus on spending more time with his mother.

== TikTok ==
Sutherland began posting videos on TikTok during the COVID-19 lockdowns as a way to raise awareness about Alzheimer's. His posts range from joyful moments, such as Linda singing and dancing, to challenging scenes depicting the effects of the disease, including memory loss and vision impairment. One viral video of Linda recognizing her late husband's name received over 2 million views. As of 2024, Graeme has amassed a following of nearly half a million across social platforms.

== Social media ==
Sutherland has used social media to amass around 600 thousand followers from around the world. Known for his TikTok, Sutherland uses Instagram and Facebook to connect with his audience. This has led to a huge amount of fundraising and helping others through similar situations.

Graeme has worked with The Smiley Company to present daily 'positive news' segments 2023–2024, which have been posted on Smiley's social media.

== Advocacy work ==
In addition to his TikTok content, Sutherland is a social media ambassador for Alzheimer Scotland. He has participated in campaigns like Scotland's Memory Walk and fundraising initiatives, including a charity skydive, the Kilt walk and walking the West Highland Way.

In 2023 Sutherland took part in 'Thank you day' by being involved in recording Tony Christies' cover version of Thank You for Being a Friend, which was originally recorded by Andrew Gold in 1978. The single was released to raise awareness for Thank You Day in aid of Music for Dementia.

== Media coverage ==
Sutherland has been on several television programs and news segments, most notably ITVs This Morning and STV news in which he shares why he began documenting the journey. He has been featured in several news outlets, including The Glasgow Times and Blethered podcast, where he shared his family's journey and the challenges of navigating life with Alzheimer's. He emphasizes the importance of early diagnosis and reducing stigma surrounding the condition. Amongst the many media avenues Sutherland has taken, he has also been on numerous radio shows to discuss Alzheimer's related topics. In September 2024 he teamed up with Bupa to highlight mental health in men, talking about how being a carer has taken a toll on his own health.

- This Morning Interview
- STV News coverage
- Glasgow Times coverage
- Smiley interview

== Recognition ==
In 2024, Sutherland was nominated for the second time by The Scottish influencer Awards, in the category 'Inspiration'. Graeme won the award as Scotland's inspirational influencer of the year.

== Further reading & External links ==
- "Graeme Sutherland's TikTok Profile". TikTok.
- "Glasgow Times Coverage". The Glasgow Times.
- "STV news featured topic". STV news. 30 November 2022.
- "Blethered Podcast" (Podcast).
- "The mirror - Last day of freedom". Daily Mirror. 25 February 2023.
- "Glasgow Live coverage". 7 June 2021.
- "Daily Record Coverage". April 2021.
- "Graeme Sutherland facebook profile". Facebook.
- "Graeme Sutherland Instagram profile".
- "Alzheimer Scotland's Memory walk involvement".
- "The Independent coverage of the Thank you day charity single". Independent.co.uk. 26 June 2023.
