= NGC 6505 =

Elliptical galaxy

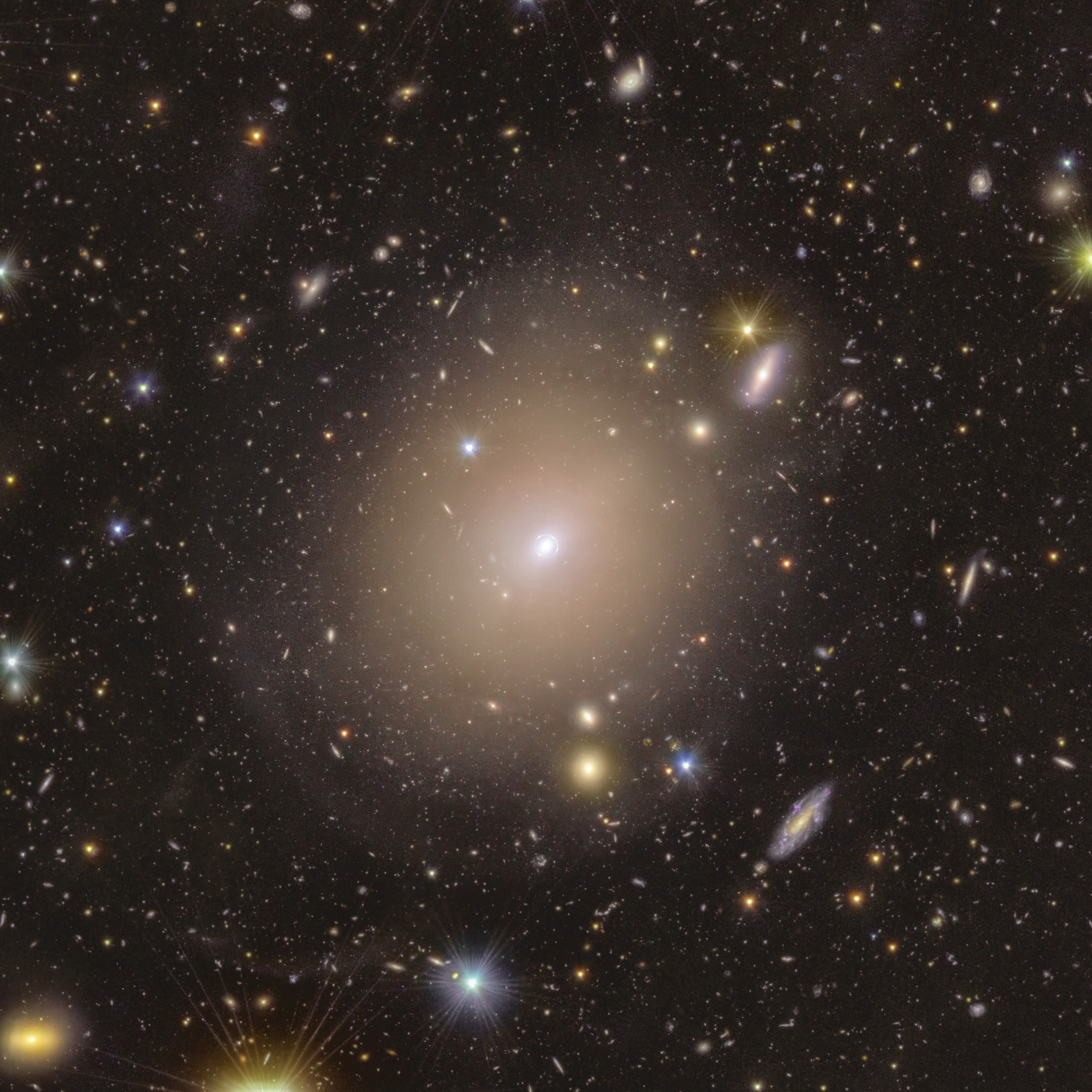
- NGC 6505 imaged by Euclid, with LEDA 2678036 (lower left) and LEDA 2678425 (upper right)

Observation data (J2000 epoch)
- Constellation: Draco
- Right ascension: 17^{h} 51^{m} 07.4726^{s}
- Declination: +65° 31′ 50.925″
- Redshift: 0.042414 ± 0.0000160
- Heliocentric radial velocity: 12,715±5 km/s
- Distance: 186.55 ± 13.06 Mpc (608.4 ± 42.6 Mly)
- Apparent magnitude (V): 14.6
- Apparent magnitude (B): 15.6
- Surface brightness: 14.8

Characteristics
- Type: E-S0
- Size: ~243,300 ly (74.59 kpc) (estimated)
- Apparent size (V): 1.1′ × 1.0′

Other designations
- 2MASX J17510740+6531507, UGC 11026, MCG +11-22-007, PGC 60995, CGCG 322-018

NGC 6505 is an elliptical galaxy with Hubble sequence classification E/S0 in the northern celestial hemisphere constellation Draco. It is about 608 million light years away from the Milky Way galaxy and has a diameter of about 190,000 light years. It was discovered on June 27, 1884 by Lewis A. Swift. In 2025, the Euclid space telescope found a complete Einstein ring surrounding NGC 6505.

With the help of the lens model some properties of the central region of NGC 6505 were estimated. One result is that the central region has an initial mass function that is heavier than predicted with Chabrier and a dark matter fraction of 11.1+5.4
−3.5 % inside the Einstein radius.

== Altieri's lens ==
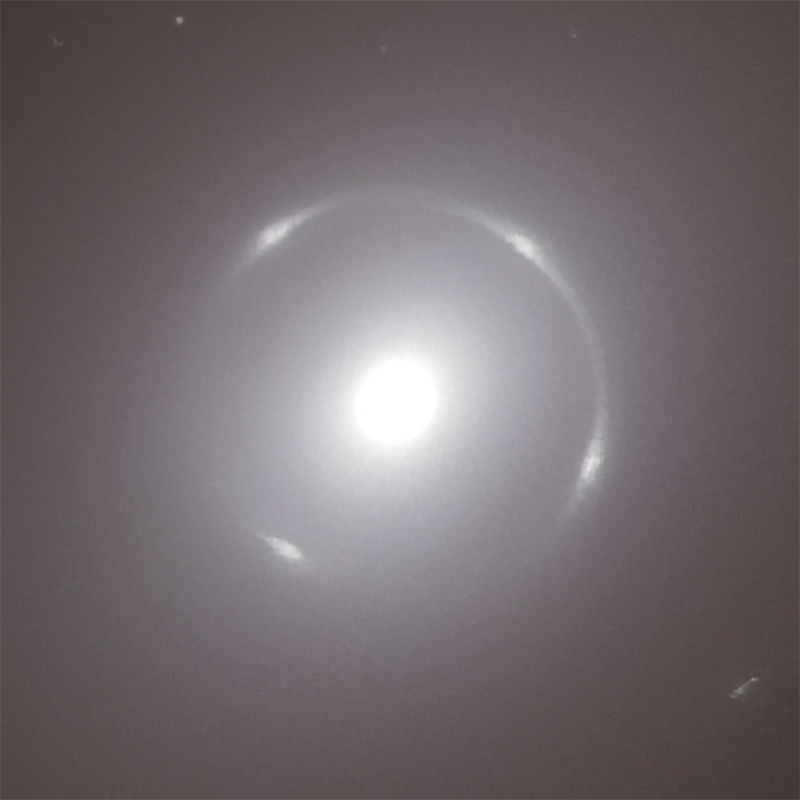
Euclid VIS instrument image of the Einstein ring. The VIS instrument has a higher resolution than NISP (This image was supersampled, achieving a resolution twice as high as the Euclid VIS data.).

A gravitational lens was discovered by Euclid Archive Scientist Bruno Altieri in data from ESA's Euclid telescope. The researchers therefore suggest the nickname "Altieri's lens". The discovery was made with early testing data from September 2023, which was out of focus. Later Euclid imaged the galaxy and the lensed galaxy with both the VIS and NIS instruments. The lens was also observed with resolved spectroscopy of the Keck Cosmic Web Imager (KCWI) and the Dark Energy Spectroscopic Instrument (DESI). The lensed galaxy has a redshift of 0.4058 ± 0.003, equivalent to a distance of 4.46 billion light-years.

The discoverers called the discovery an "exceptionally rare strong lens" and the first gravitational lens found in any NGC galaxy.

== See also ==
- List of NGC objects (6001–7000)
