= SDSS J1038+4849 =

Galaxy cluster in the constellation Ursa Major

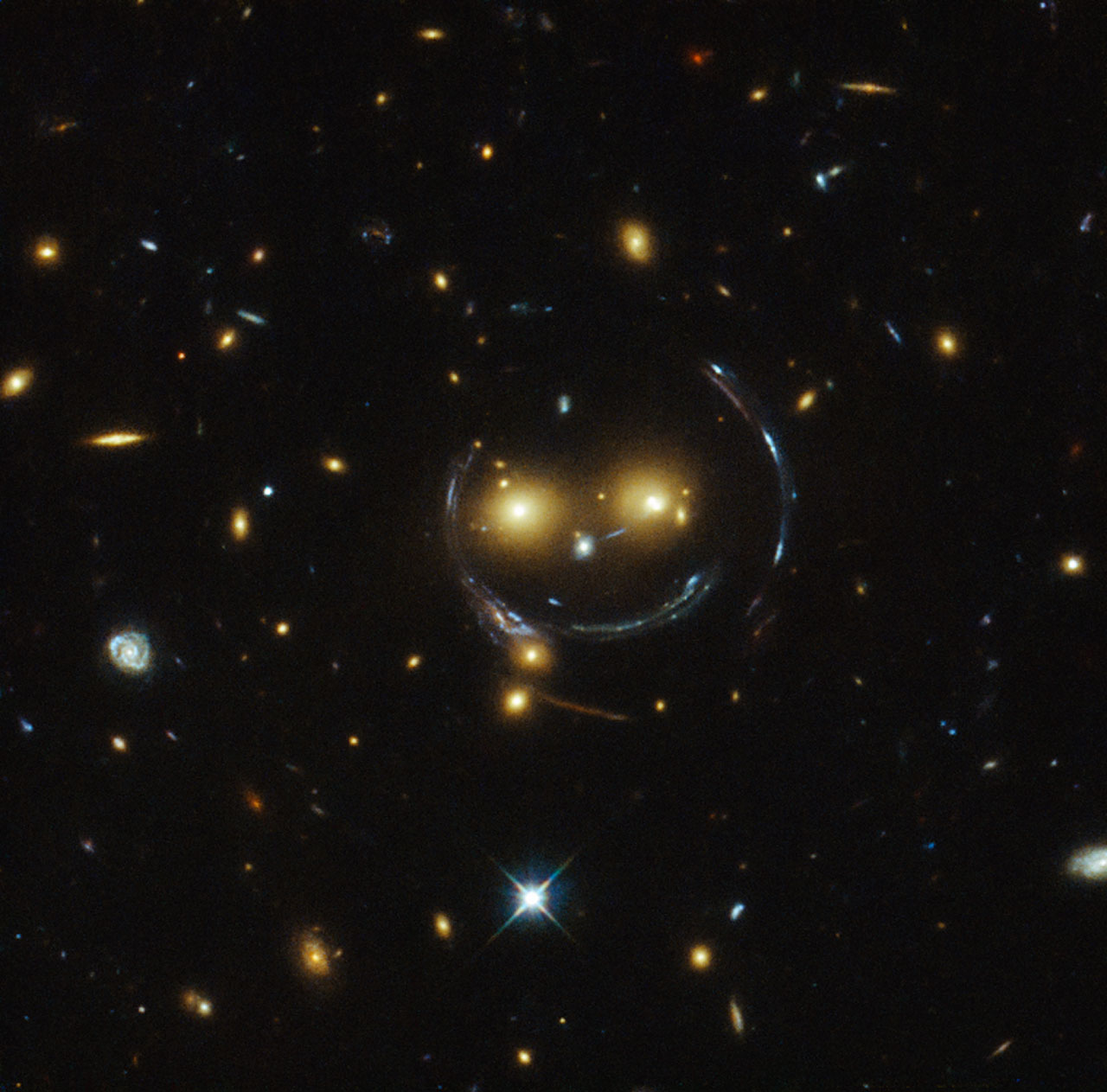
Hubble Space Telescope image of the galaxy cluster SDSS J1038+4849

SDSS J1038+4849 is a galaxy cluster 4.5 billion light-years away in the constellation Ursa Major, famous for its appearance as a smiley face. The yellow eyes and white nose are distant galaxies, while the Einstein ring-forming smile and border are caused by gravitational lensing.

== See also ==
- Pareidolia
