= Gravitational mirage =

Optical Phenomena apparent during observations of Extragalactic Spacetime phenomena

A gravitational mirage or cosmic mirage is an optical phenomenon affecting the appearance of a distant star or galaxy, seen only through a telescope. It can take the form of a ring or rings partially or completely surrounding the object, a duplicate image adjacent to the object, or multiple duplicate images surrounding the object. Sometimes the direct view of the original object itself is dimmed or absent.

The illusion is caused by a gravitational lens, in space between the object and the observer's telescope, which bends light as it travels. The effect is analogous to the atmospheric mirage, which has been observed since antiquity, in circumstances where the air temperature varies strongly with height over the ground or sea; the rapidly changing refractive index bends light, producing inverted and/or multiple images "floating" in the air.

Ring-shaped gravitational mirages are referred to as Einstein rings, and one multiple-image gravitational mirage is named the Einstein Cross, as a tribute to Einstein's predictions regarding gravitational lensing.

== History ==
Gravitational bending of light was predicted by Einstein's general relativity in 1916, and first observed by astronomers in 1919 during a total solar eclipse. Accurate measurements of stars seen in the dark sky near the eclipsed Sun indicated a displacement in the direction opposite to the Sun, about as much as predicted by Einstein's theory. The effect is due to the gravitational attraction of the photons when they pass near the Sun on their way to Earth. This was a direct confirmation of an entirely new phenomenon and it represented a milestone in physics.

The possibility of gravitational lensing was suggested in 1924 and clarified by Albert Einstein in 1936. In 1937, Swiss astronomer Fritz Zwicky (1898 - 1974), working at the Mount Wilson Observatory in California, realized that galaxies and galaxy clusters far out in space may be sufficiently compact and massive to observably bend the light from even more distant objects through gravitational lensing. His ideas were confirmed in 1979, when the first example of a cosmic mirage was discovered, the Twin Quasar.
