= Einstein radius =

Measurement of light ray bending from a gravitational lens

The Einstein radius is the radius of an Einstein ring, and is a characteristic angle for gravitational lensing in general, as typical distances between images in gravitational lensing are of the order of the Einstein radius.

== Derivation ==
The geometry of gravitational lenses

In the following derivation of the Einstein radius, we will assume that all of mass M of the lensing galaxy L is concentrated in the center of the galaxy.

For a point mass the deflection can be calculated and is one of the classical tests of general relativity. For small angles α_{1} the total deflection by a point mass M is given (see Schwarzschild metric) by

$$\alpha_1 = \frac{4G}{c^2}\frac{M}{b_1}$$

where

b_{1} is the impact parameter (the distance of nearest approach of the lightbeam to the center of mass)
G is the gravitational constant,
c is the speed of light.

By noting that, for small angles and with the angle expressed in radians, the point of nearest approach b_{1} at an angle θ_{1} for the lens L on a distance D_{L} is given by b_{1} = θ_{1} D_{L}, we can re-express the bending angle α_{1} as

$\alpha_1(\theta_1) = \frac{4G}{c^2}\frac{M}{\theta_1}\frac{1}{D_{\rm L}}$ ..... (Eqn. 1)

If we set θ_{S} as the angle at which one would see the source without the lens (which is generally not observable), and θ_{1} as the observed angle of the image of the source with respect to the lens, then one can see from the geometry of lensing (counting distances in the source plane) that the vertical distance spanned by the angle θ_{1} at a distance D_{S} is the same as the sum of the two vertical distances θ_{S} D_{S} and α_{1} D_{LS}. This gives the lens equation

$$\theta_1 \; D_{\rm S} = \theta_{\rm S}\; D_{\rm S} + \alpha_1 \; D_{\rm LS}$$

which can be rearranged to give

$\alpha_1(\theta_1) = \frac{D_{\rm S}}{D_{\rm LS}} (\theta_1 - \theta_{\rm S})$ ..... (Eqn. 2)

By setting (eq. 1) equal to (eq. 2), and rearranging, we get

$$\theta_1-\theta_{\rm S} = \frac{4G}{c^2} \; \frac{M}{\theta_1} \; \frac{D_{\rm LS}}{D_{\rm S} D_{\rm L}}$$

For a source right behind the lens, θ_{S} = 0, the lens equation for a point mass gives a characteristic value for θ_{1} that is called the Einstein angle, denoted θ_{E}. When θ_{E} is expressed in radians, and the lensing source is sufficiently far away, the Einstein Radius, denoted R_{E}, is given by

$R_E = \theta_E D_{\rm L}$.

Putting θ_{S} = 0 and solving for θ_{1} gives

$$\theta_E = \left(\frac{4GM}{c^2}\;\frac{D_{\rm LS}}{D_{\rm L} D_{\rm S}}\right)^{1/2}$$

The Einstein angle for a point mass provides a convenient linear scale to make dimensionless lensing variables. In terms of the Einstein angle, the lens equation for a point mass becomes

$$\theta_1 = \theta_{\rm S} + \frac{\theta_E^2}{\theta_1}$$

Substituting for the constants gives

$$\theta_E = \left(\frac{M}{10^{11.09} M_{\bigodot}}\right)^{1/2} \left(\frac{D_{\rm L} D_{\rm S}/ D_{\rm LS}}{\rm{Gpc}}\right)^{-1/2} \rm{arcsec}$$

In the latter form, the mass is expressed in solar masses (M_{☉} and the distances in Gigaparsec (Gpc). The Einstein radius is most prominent for a lens typically halfway between the source and the observer.

For a dense cluster with mass M_{c} ≈ 10×10^{15} M_{☉} at a distance of 1 Gigaparsec (1 Gpc) this radius could be as large as 100 arcsec (called macrolensing). For a Gravitational microlensing event (with masses of order 1 M_{☉}) search for at galactic distances (say D ~ 3 kpc), the typical Einstein radius would be of order milli-arcseconds. Consequently, separate images in microlensing events are impossible to observe with current techniques.

Likewise, for the lower ray of light reaching the observer from below the lens, we have

$$\theta_2 \; D_{\rm S} = - \; \theta_{\rm S}\; D_{\rm S} + \alpha_2 \; D_{\rm LS}$$

and

$$\theta_2 + \theta_{\rm S} = \frac{4G}{c^2} \; \frac{M}{\theta_2} \; \frac{D_{\rm LS}}{D_{\rm S} D_{\rm L}}$$

and thus

$$\theta_2 = - \; \theta_{\rm S} + \frac{\theta_E^2}{\theta_2}$$

The argument above can be extended for lenses which have a distributed mass, rather than a point mass, by using a different expression for the bend angle α the positions θ_{I}(θ_{S}) of the images can then be calculated. For small deflections this mapping is one-to-one and consists of distortions of the observed positions which are invertible. This is called weak lensing. For large deflections one can have multiple images and a non-invertible mapping: this is called strong lensing. Note that in order for a distributed mass to result in an Einstein ring, it must be axially symmetric.

== See also ==
- Gravitational lens
- Einstein ring

== Bibliography ==
- Chwolson, O (1924). "Über eine mögliche Form fiktiver Doppelsterne". Astronomische Nachrichten. 221 (20): 329–330. Bibcode:1924AN....221..329C. doi:10.1002/asna.19242212003. (The first paper to propose rings)
- Einstein, Albert (1936). "Lens-like Action of a Star by the Deviation of Light in the Gravitational Field" (PDF). Science. 84 (2188): 506–507. Bibcode:1936Sci....84..506E. doi:10.1126/science.84.2188.506. JSTOR 1663250. PMID 17769014. S2CID 38450435. Archived from the original (PDF) on 2018-04-29. (The famous Einstein Ring paper)
- Renn, Jürgen; Tilman Sauer & John Stachel (1997). "The Origin of Gravitational Lensing: A Postscript to Einstein's 1936 Science paper". Science. 275 (5297): 184–186. Bibcode:1997Sci...275..184R. doi:10.1126/science.275.5297.184. PMID 8985006. S2CID 43449111.
