= PKS 1830−211 =

Quasar in the constellation Sagittarius

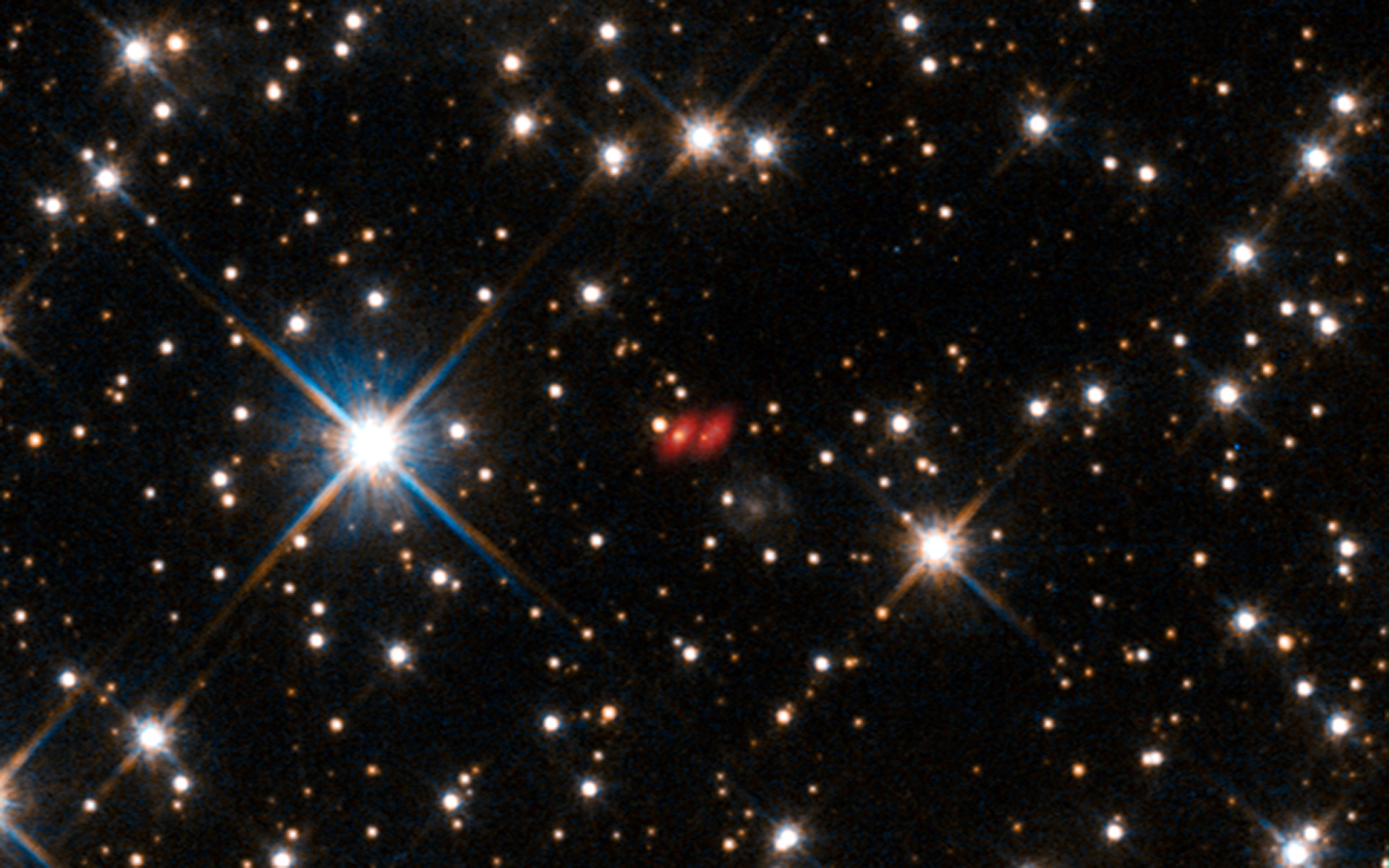
- HST image of PKG 1830−211 (center)

Observation data (Epoch J2000)
- Constellation: Sagittarius
- Right ascension: 18^{h} 33^{m} 39.949^{s}
- Declination: −21° 03′ 39.37″
- Redshift: 2.507±0.002
- Type: FSRQ

Other designations
- 3FGL J1833.6−2103

PKS 1830−211 is a gravitationally-lensed blazar in the southern constellation of Sagittarius, one of the most powerful such objects known. It has a high redshift (z) of 2.507, an indicator of its significant distance. This flat-spectrum radio quasar (FSRQ) is one of the brightest extraterrestrial radio sources. In visible light, identification of this object is hampered by the galactic plane and an M-type star that lies near the line of sight.

This quasar was first detected in 1969 during a radio survey by the Parkes Observatory in Australia. In 1984, it was found to display interplanetary scintillation, suggesting structure on angular scales of less than an arc second. Radio observations in 1988 found an unusual double structure separated by an angle of ~1 arc second. The flat radio spectrum and double structure of this feature are suggestive of gravitational lensing by a foreground galaxy. Interferometric radio telescope observation was used to detect an unusually bright Einstein ring in 1991, spanning a radius of 1″.

Radio observations of PKS 1830−211 made over a 13-month period were used to measure changes in flux density. Both components displayed dramatic changes in their flux level, with the fluctuation on one component matched by the other about 44 days later. This lent strong support to the idea this is a gravitationally lensed system. The time delay was refined to 26^{+4}_{−5} days in 1998. In 1996, absorption of neutral hydrogen was detected at a redshift of 0.19, suggesting a possible second lensing galaxy for a compound gravitational lens. This object was confirmed via infrared imagery in 2005. However, this second galaxy is thought to have a negligible effect on the overall lensing.

Imaging of the quasar with the Hubble Space Telescope in 2002 identified the lens galaxy as a normal spiral galaxy at a redshift of 0.886. It is inclined at an angle of 25° to the plane of the sky, appearing nearly face-on. Based on the size of the Einstein ring, this galaxy has a mass of about 10^{11} M_{☉}, which is comparable to the Milky Way. An independent analysis of the same imaging data suggested the possible presence of a main-sequence star within 0.5″ of the target. A third point-like lensed image of the quasar was detected in 2020, located part way between the other two. PKS 1830−211 is a source for gamma-ray emission that undergoes significant flaring.

PKS 1830−211 has been used as a radio source for measuring redshifted molecular species, including ArH^{+}, CF^{+}, HCN, HCO^{+}, H_{2}O, NH_{3}, and OH^{+}. As of 2014, it is the "extragalactic object with the largest number of detected molecular species". In 2023, Rydberg atoms were detected in the foreground galaxy by the MeerKAT telescope array.
