= Einstein ring =

Feature seen when light is gravitationally lensed by an object

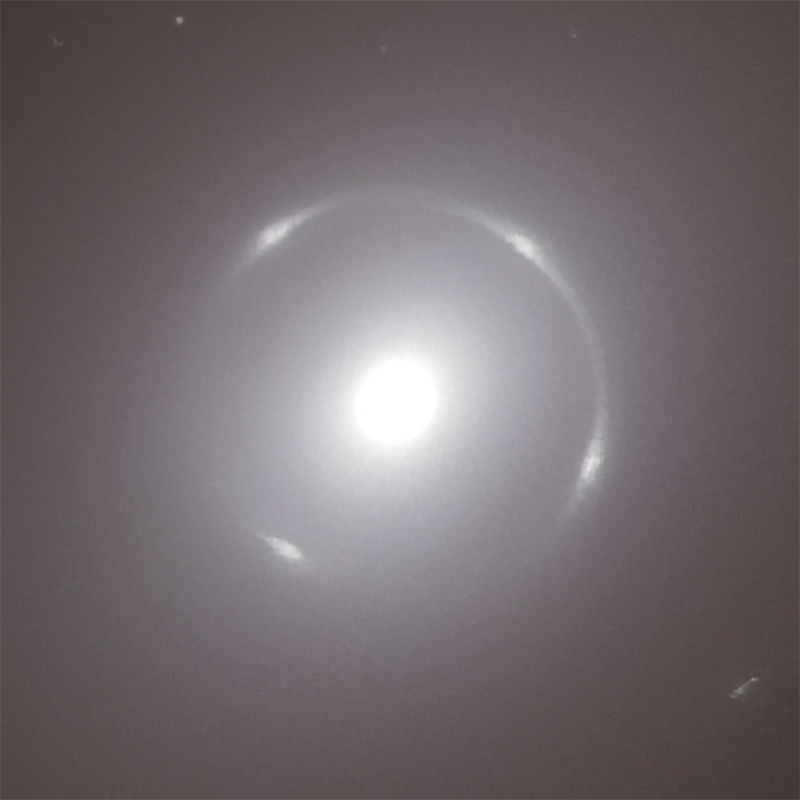
Einstein ring, created by a nearer galaxy (NGC 6505) distorting light of a distant galaxy. Four images of the distant galaxy, corresponding to four bright spots, can be seen in this picture.

An Einstein ring, also known as an Einstein–Chwolson ring or Chwolson ring (named for Orest Chwolson), is created when light from a galaxy or star passes by a massive object en route to the Earth. Due to gravitational lensing, the light is diverted, making it seem to come from different places. If source, lens, and observer are all in perfect alignment (syzygy), the light appears as a ring.

== Introduction ==
Gravitational lensing is predicted by Albert Einstein's theory of general relativity. Instead of light from a source traveling in a straight line (in three dimensions), it is bent by the presence of a massive body, which distorts spacetime. An Einstein ring is a special case of gravitational lensing, caused by the exact alignment of the source, lens, and observer. This results in symmetry around the lens, causing a ring-like structure.

The geometry of a complete Einstein ring, as caused by a gravitational lens

The size of an Einstein ring is given by the Einstein radius. In radians, it is

$$\theta_1 = \sqrt{\frac{4GM}{c^2}\;\frac{D_{LS}}{D_S D_L}},$$

where

$G$ is the gravitational constant,
$M$ is the mass of the lens,
$c$ is the speed of light,
$D_L$ is the angular diameter distance to the lens,
$D_S$ is the angular diameter distance to the source, and
$D_{LS}$ is the angular diameter distance between the lens and the source.

Over cosmological distances $D_{LS}\ne D_S-D_L$ in general.

== History ==
The bending of light by a gravitational body was predicted by Albert Einstein in 1912, a few years before the publication of general relativity in 1916 (Renn et al. 1997). The ring effect was first mentioned in the academic literature by Orest Khvolson in a short article in 1924, in which he mentioned the “halo effect” of gravitation when the source, lens, and observer are in near-perfect alignment. Einstein remarked upon this effect in 1936 in a paper prompted by a letter by a Czech engineer, R. W. Mandl, but stated,

Of course, there is no hope of observing this phenomenon directly. First, we shall scarcely ever approach closely enough to such a central line. Second, the angle β will defy the resolving power of our instruments.

— Science vol. 84, p. 506. (1936)

(In this statement, β is the Einstein Angle currently denoted by $\theta_1,$ as in the expression above.) However, Einstein was only considering the chance of observing Einstein rings produced by stars, which is low – the chance of observing those produced by larger lenses such as galaxies or black holes is higher since the angular size of an Einstein ring increases with the mass of the lens.

The first complete Einstein ring, designated B1938+666, was discovered by collaboration between astronomers at the University of Manchester and NASA's Hubble Space Telescope in 1998.

There have apparently not been any observations of a star forming an Einstein ring with another star, but there is a 45% chance of this happening in early May 2028 when Alpha Centauri A passes between us and a distant red star.

=== Known Einstein rings ===
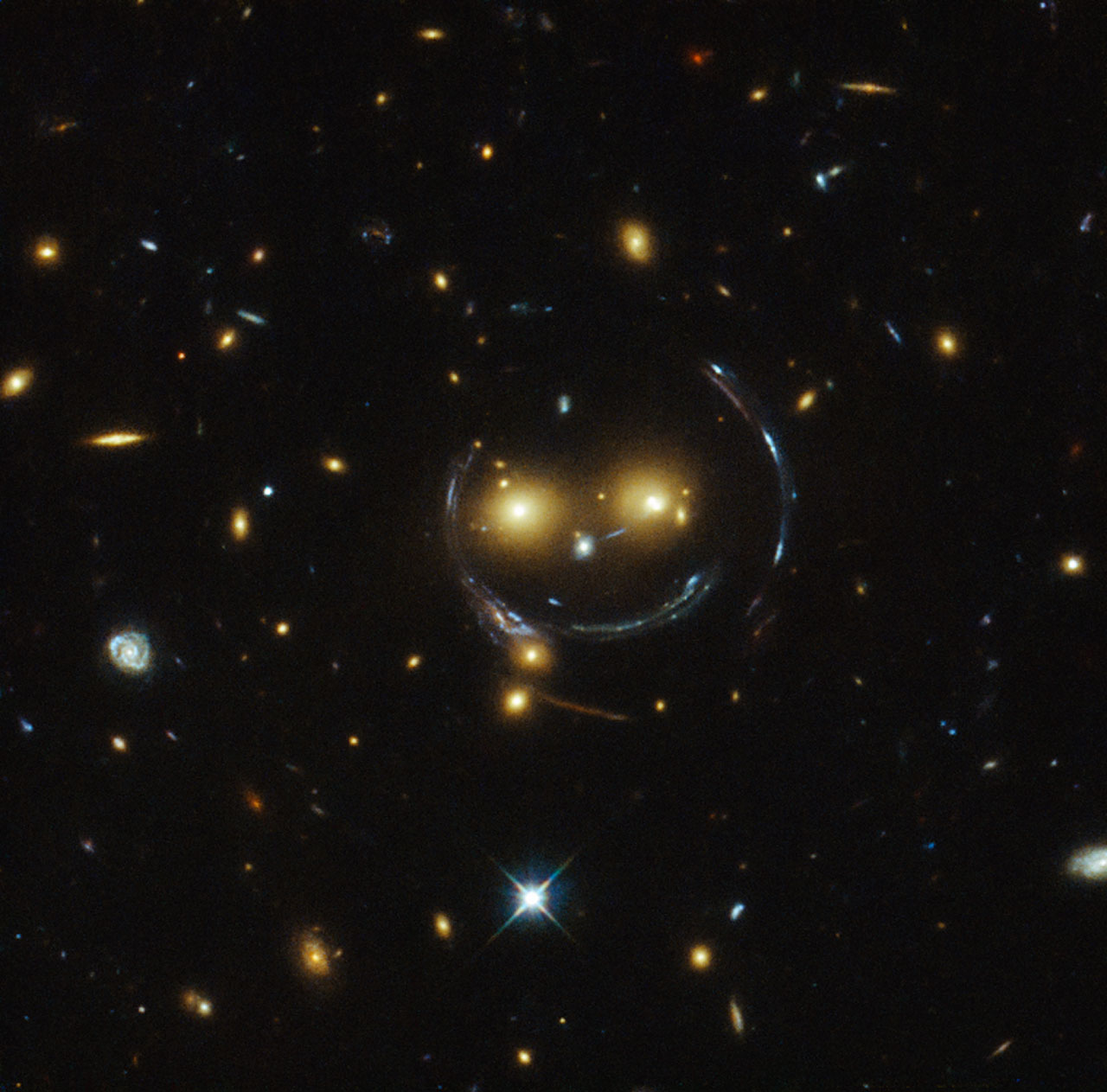
"Smiley" or "Cheshire Cat" image of galaxy cluster (SDSS J1038+4849) and gravitational lensing (an "Einstein ring") discovered by an international team of scientists, imaged with HST

Hundreds of gravitational lenses are currently known. About half a dozen of them are partial Einstein rings with diameters up to an arcsecond, although as either the mass distribution of the lenses is not perfectly axially symmetrical, or the source, lens, and observer are not perfectly aligned, we have yet to see a perfect Einstein ring. Most rings have been discovered in the radio range. The degree of completeness needed for an image seen through a gravitational lens to qualify as an Einstein ring is yet to be defined.

The first Einstein ring was discovered by Hewitt et al. (1988), who observed the radio source MG 1131+0456 using the Very Large Array. This observation saw a quasar lensed by a nearer galaxy into two separate but very similar images of the same object, the images stretched round the lens into an almost complete ring. These dual images are another possible effect of the source, lens, and observer not being perfectly aligned.

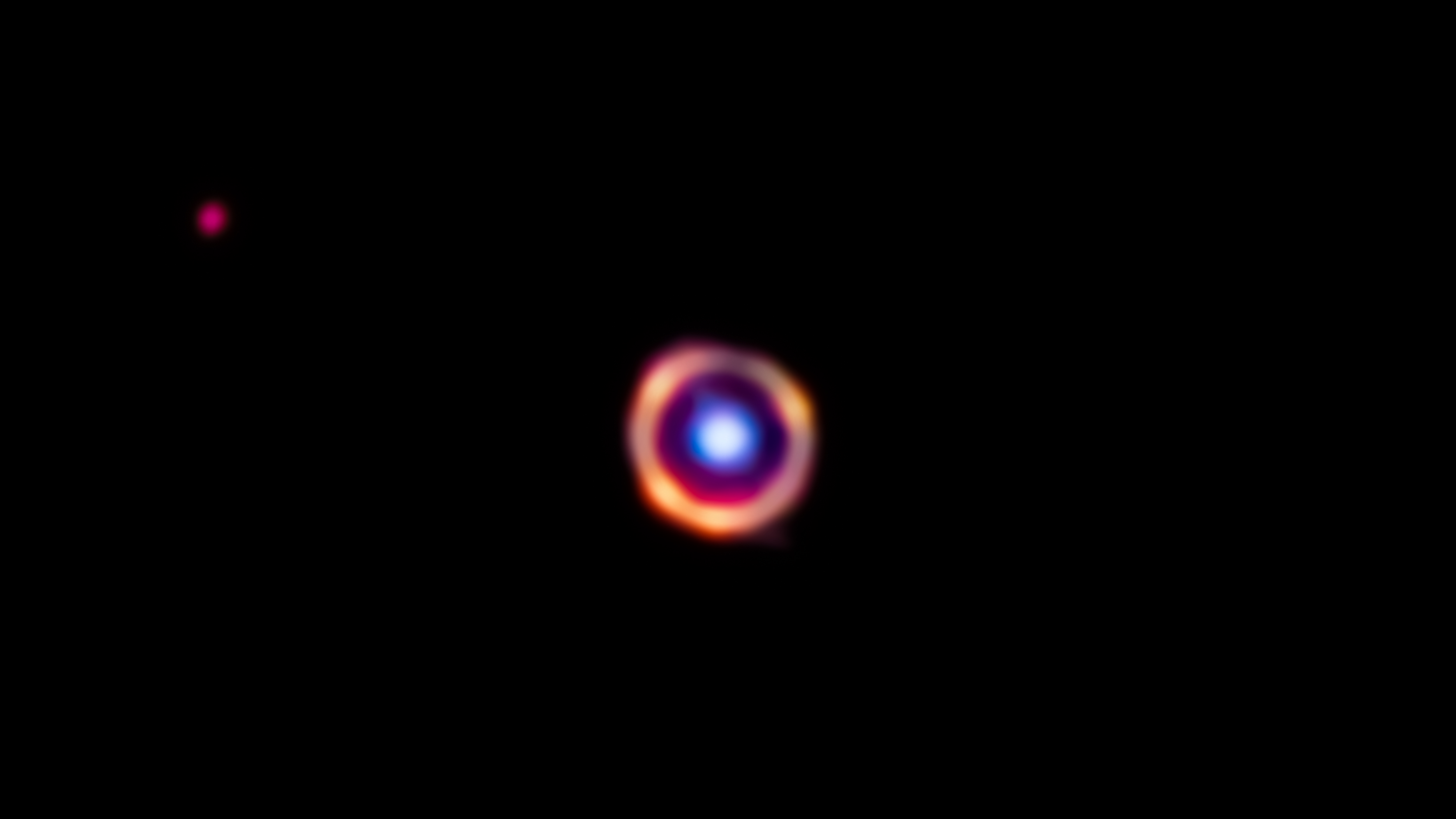
JWST false-color image of SPT0418-47, a high-redshift galaxy rich in organic molecules, which appears as a nearly-perfect Einstein ring

The first complete Einstein ring to be discovered was B1938+666, which was found by King et al. (1998) via optical follow-up with the Hubble Space Telescope of a gravitational lens imaged with MERLIN. The galaxy causing the lens at B1938+666 is an ancient elliptical galaxy, and the image we see through the lens is a dark dwarf satellite galaxy, which we would otherwise not be able to see with current technology.

In 2005, the combined power of the Sloan Digital Sky Survey (SDSS) with the Hubble Space Telescope was used in the Sloan Lens ACS (SLACS) Survey to find 19 new gravitational lenses, 8 of which showed Einstein rings, these are the 8 shown in the adjacent image. As of 2009, this survey has found 85 confirmed gravitational lenses but there is not yet a number for how many show Einstein rings. This survey is responsible for most of the recent discoveries of Einstein rings in the optical range, following are some examples which were found:

- FOR J0332-3557, discovered by Remi Cabanac et al. in 2005, notable for its high redshift which allows us to use it to make observations about the early universe.
- The "Cosmic Horseshoe" is a partial Einstein ring which was observed through the gravitational lens of LRG 3-757, a distinctively large Luminous Red Galaxy. It was discovered in 2007 by V. Belokurov et al.
- SDSS J0946+1006, the "double Einstein ring" was discovered by Raphael Gavazzi and Tommaso Treu in 2008, notable for the presence of multiple rings observed through the same gravitational lens, the significance of which is explained in the next section on extra rings.

Another example is the radio/X-Ray Einstein ring around PKS 1830-211, which is unusually strong in radio. It was discovered in X-Ray by Varsha Gupta et al. at the Chandra X-Ray observatory It is also notable for being the first case of a quasar being lensed by an almost face-on spiral galaxy.

The galaxy MG 1654+1346 features a radio ring. The image in the ring is that of a quasar radio lobe, discovered in 1989 by G.Langston et al.

In June 2023, a team of astronomers led by Justin Spilker announced their discovery of an Einstein ring of a distant galaxy rich in organic molecules (aromatic hydrocarbons).

In September 2023, a scientist named Bruno Altieri saw a hint of an Einstein ring in the data coming back from the Euclid space telescope. The ring is located in a galaxy, NGC 6505, that is not too far from Earth–about 600-million light years away.

In February 2025, the Euclid space telescope captured a nearly perfect Einstein ring around galaxy NGC 6505, about 590 million light-years away. This gravitational lensing effect bent light from a background galaxy 4.42 billion light-years away.

== Extra rings ==
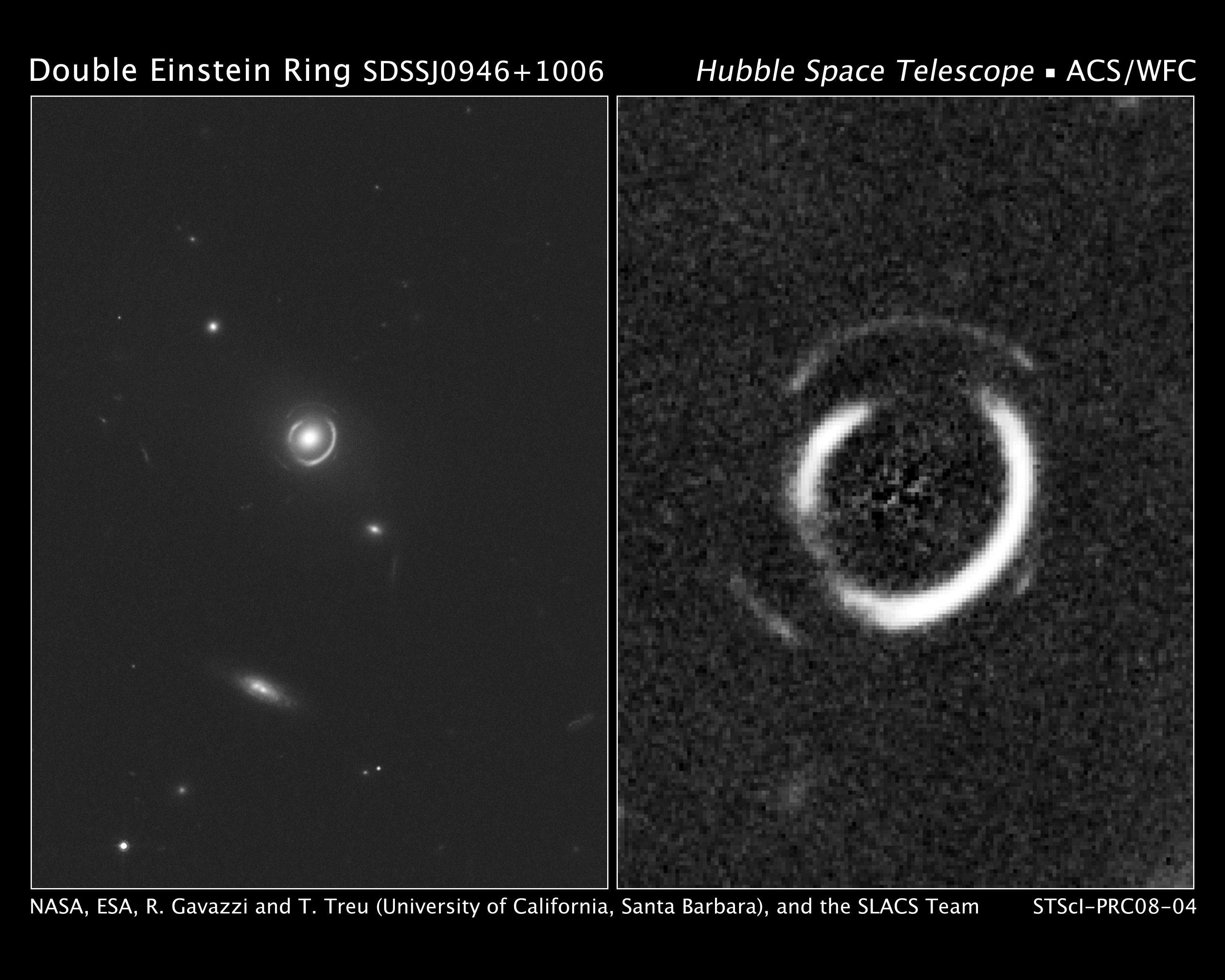
SDSS J0946+1006 is a double Einstein ring. Credit: HST/NASA/ESA

Using the Hubble Space Telescope, a double ring has been found by Raphael Gavazzi of the STScI and Tommaso Treu of the University of California, Santa Barbara. This arises from the light from three galaxies at distances of 3, 6, and 11 billion light years. Such rings help in understanding the distribution of dark matter, dark energy, the nature of distant galaxies, and the curvature of the universe. The odds of finding such a double ring around a massive galaxy are 1 in 10,000. Sampling 50 suitable double rings would provide astronomers with a more accurate measurement of the dark matter content of the universe and the equation of state of the dark energy to within 10 percent precision.

=== Simulation ===
Below is a simulation depicting a zoom on a Schwarzschild black hole in the plane of the Milky Way between us and the centre of the galaxy. The first Einstein ring is the most distorted region of the picture and shows the galactic disc. The zoom then reveals a series of 4 extra rings, increasingly thinner and closer to the black hole shadow. They are multiple images of the galactic disk. The first and third correspond to points which are behind the black hole (from the observer's position) and correspond here to the bright yellow region of the galactic disc (close to the galactic center), whereas the second and fourth correspond to images of objects which are behind the observer, which appear bluer, since the corresponding part of the galactic disc is thinner and hence dimmer here.

A simulated view of a black hole passing in front of a galaxy

Einstein rings close to a black hole

== Gallery ==
Euclid image of a bright Einstein ring around galaxy NGC 6505

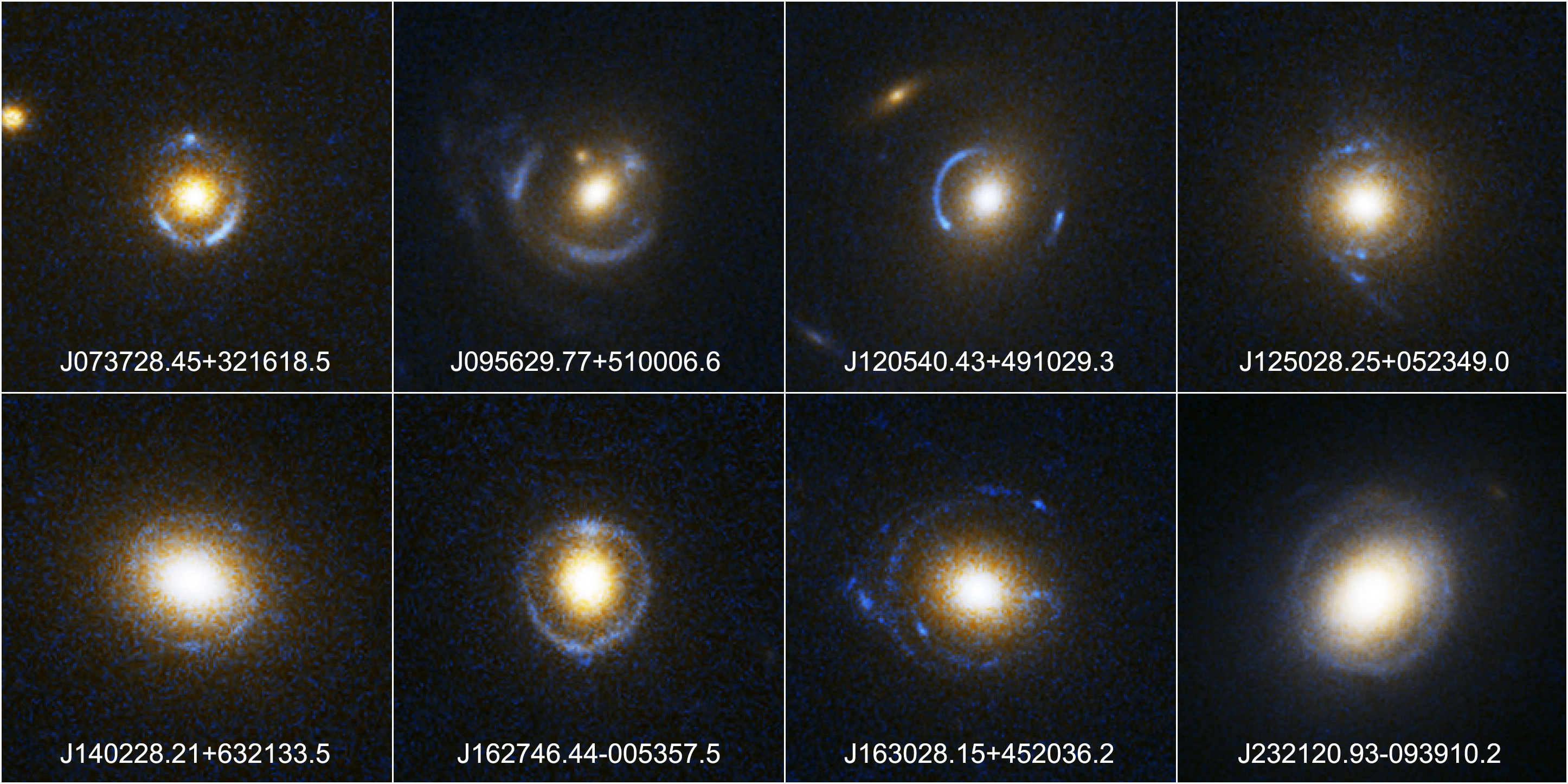
Some observed Einstein rings by the Sloan Lens ACS (SLACS)

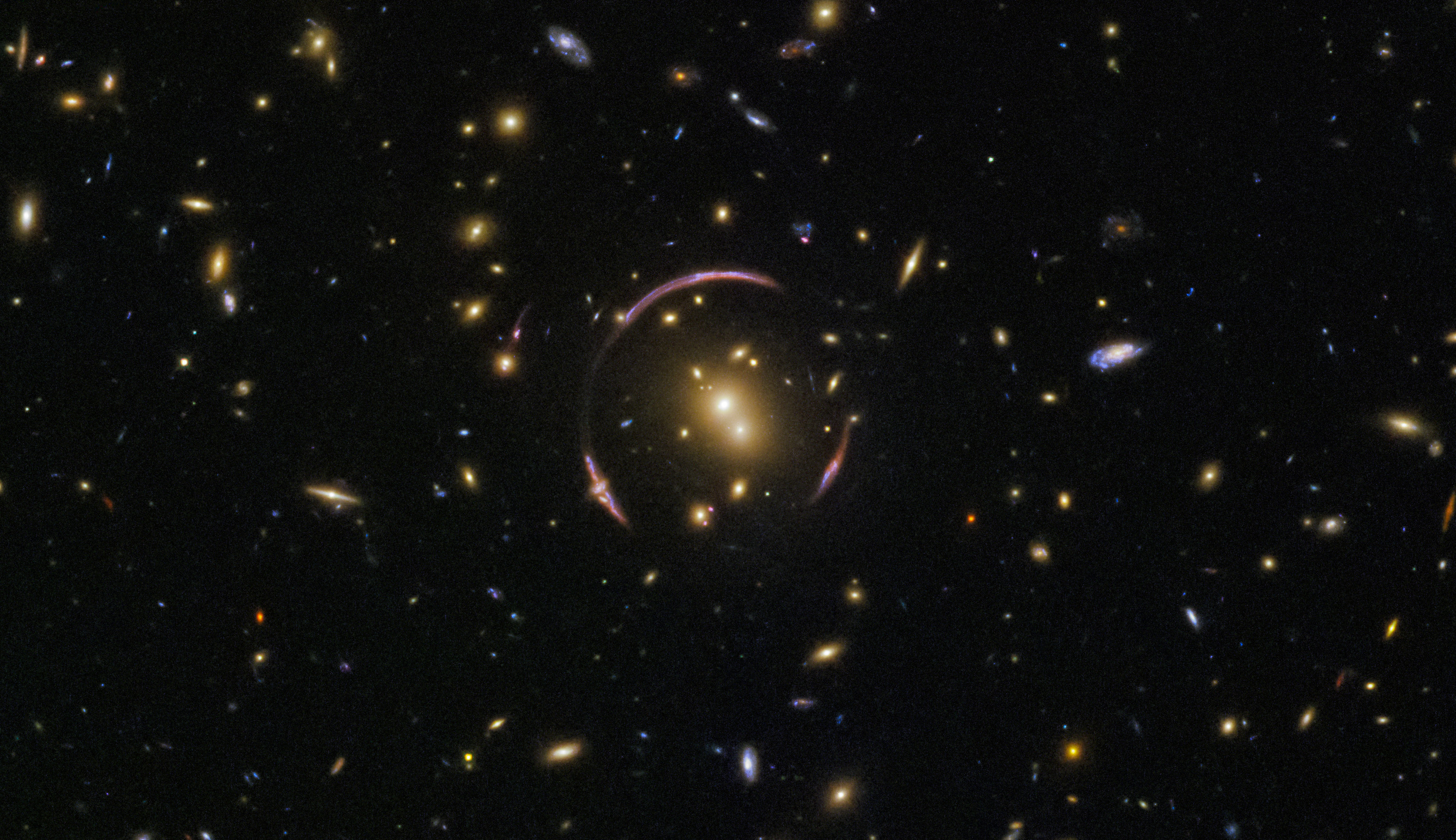
Graceful arcs around SDSS J0146-0929 are examples of an Einstein ring

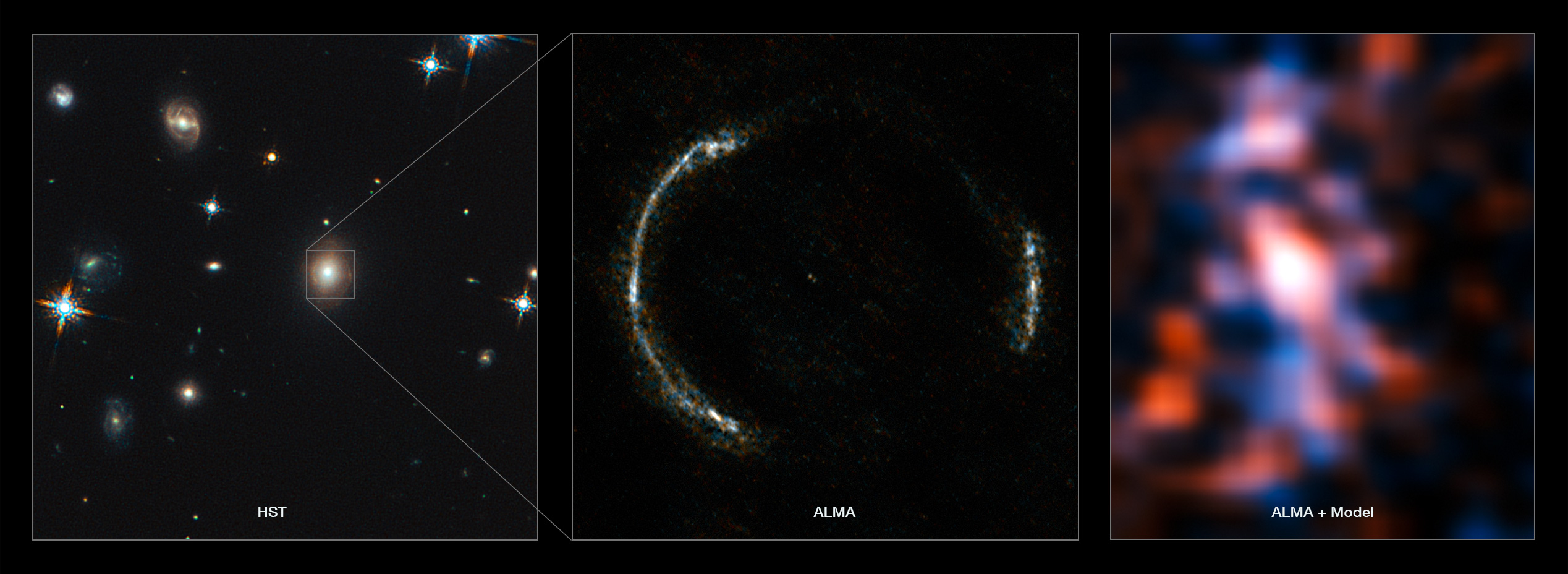
Montage of the SDP.81 Einstein ring and the lensed galaxy

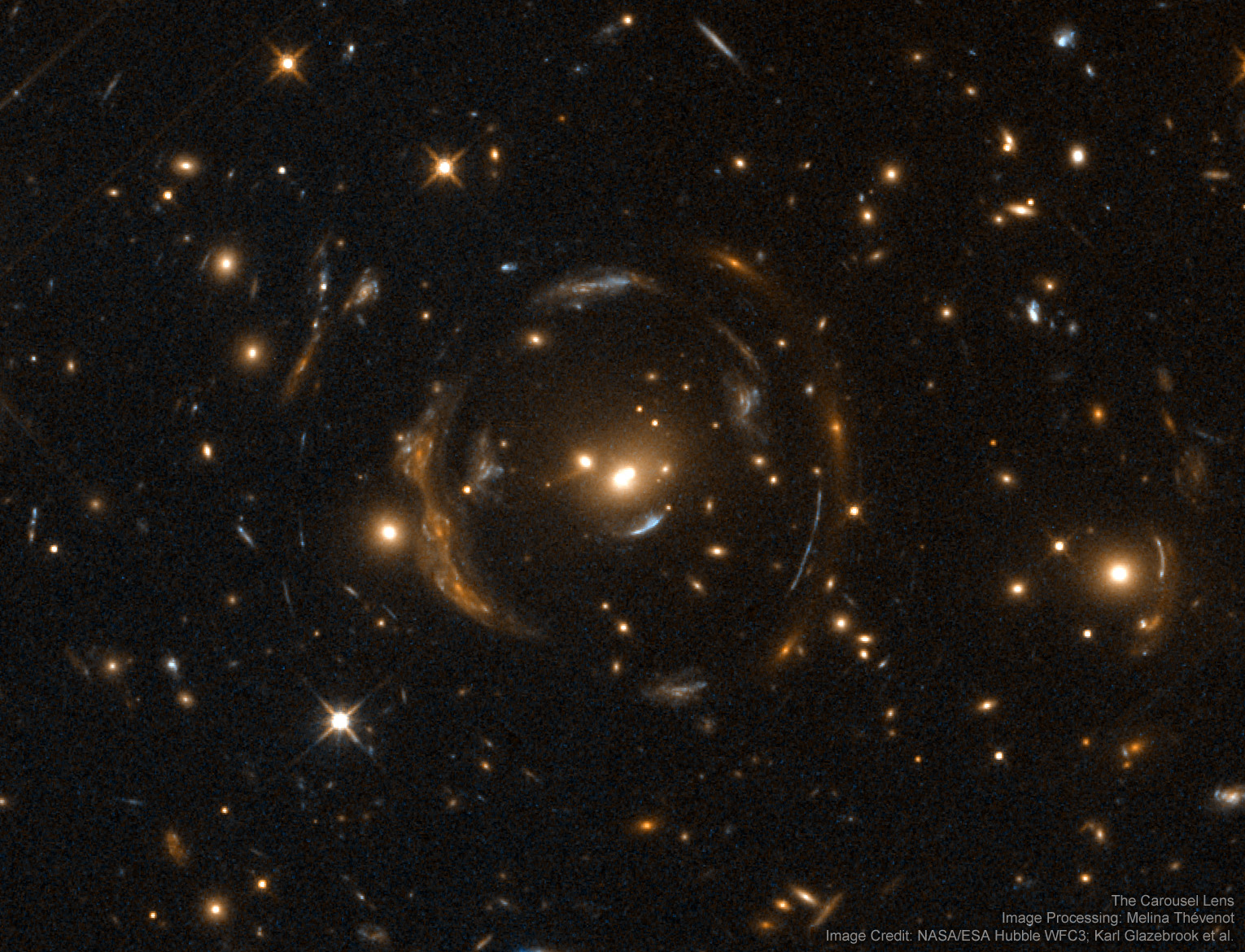
The Carousel Lens shows 7 individual galaxies lensed by one core. Additional lenses are seen further out.

== See also ==
- Einstein Cross
- Einstein radius
- Gravitational mirage
