= The Smiley Company =

British brand licensing company

SmileyWorld Limited
- Trade name: The Smiley Company
- Formerly: The Smiley Licensing Corporation Limited (1996–2001)
- Type: Private company limited by shares
- Industry: Brand licensing, Marketing
- Founded: 1971; 55 years ago in France; 19 September 1996; 30 years ago in London, England (as The Smiley Licensing Corporation Limited)
- Founder: Franklin Loufrani
- Headquarters: London, England
- Area served: Global
- Key people: Franklin Loufrani (founder & president); Nicolas Loufrani (CEO)
- Revenue: $ 538 million (2020)
- Number of employees: 40 (2016)
- Subsidiaries: SmileyWorld
- Website: Official website

SmileyWorld Limited, trading as The Smiley Company, is a brand licensing company based in London, United Kingdom. It claims to hold the rights to the smiley face in over 100 countries. The company licenses products including textiles, puzzles, party goods, stationery, automobile accessories, and toys for licensed brand partners and retailers. Its main licensing markets are fashion and beauty in recent years, having collaborated with numerous fashion houses and brands.

== History ==
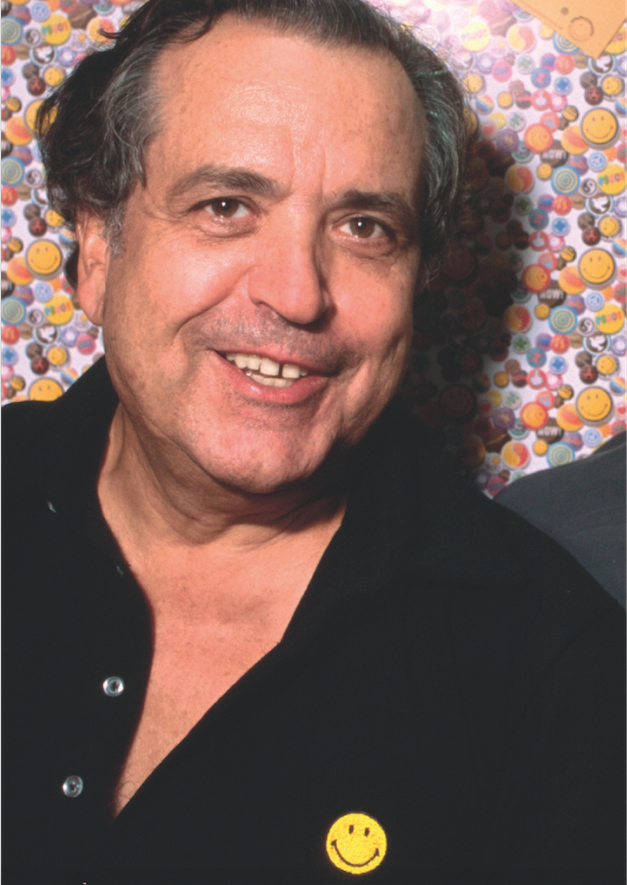
Franklin Loufrani, founder of the Smiley Company

In 1967, before his use of the smiley face, Franklin Loufrani was already active in the French poster industry. Contemporary reports press described him as a leading figure in the Paris poster boom, noting that he ran a sales promotion firm and was seen as a "pillar of the poster industry". Loufrani was "beaten by another firm" to copyright the word poster in France, but he stated he was determined not to be "caught napping again". To that end, he copyrighted the word psychedelic in France and began working with publisher Hachette on what he described as a "cosmic comic strip", predicting that merchandising around the theme would rival Olympic campaigns. Around the same time, he also introduced a "psychedelic" greeting card, a squiggly design incorporating the number "68", which he claimed to have patented. While these ventures attracted publicity, they foreshadowed his later focus on trademarks and merchandising.

Franklin Loufrani worked as a journalist in France during the 1960s and 70s. In 1971, while working for France-Soir as a freelance business consultant, he ran a campaign for the paper to highlight good news. These stories were accompanied with a stylized smiley face inside the "o" of "France Soir", and the phrase "take the time to smile". He registered his version of the smiley symbol at the French trademark office a few months prior to the campaign launch, making him the first person to register the symbol for commercial use.

That same year, he left his position as a journalist and soon began The Smiley Company licensing operation. The smiley began as a freebie sticker, rather than the commercial enterprise it is today. With economic opportunities lacking, Loufrani began handing out stickers to university students in an attempt to raise the profile of the smiley. While changes were taking place socially and politically, young people struggled in the gloomy aftermath of May 68. It was of the main reasons Loufrani was tasked with the positive news segment initially back in 1971 at France-Soir. Loufrani started to trial handing out smiley stickers to young people, mainly at universities. French university students adopted the stickers, which appeared on backpacks, notebooks, and in bars. The stickers were used in various public and private settings as a means of conveying optimism. The trend soon spread beyond university communities, with the wider French public displaying the stickers in urban areas on lampposts, storefronts, and car bumpers.

The rise of the smiley's use in France had made it iconic by the mid-1970s. By 1975, Loufrani had produced and distributed over 10 million stickers. In the process he had a small group of people to assist him with the effort of distribution and also formal commercial channels with institutions and events so the stickers could be handed out. As corporations placed greater emphasis on creative advertising in Europe, the popularity of licensing grew. While smiley had found success in social circles, early commercial deals were mainly part of one-off campaigns. In 1975, Loufrani had his first big commercial break. Due to legal restrictions, M&M's were unable to launch their famous product in certain European countries. The solution to this was to launch a forerunner to M&M's in Europe, which were known as Bonitos. They had attempted to break the European market with Bonitos since the 1960s, originally starting in The Netherlands. In 1975, they launched the Bonitos in France, and since they could not use the iconic "M&M" print on its chocolate discs, they sought a replacement. Bonitos agreed a deal with Loufrani to print a smiley on the front of the chocolate discs in France and elsewhere in Europe. The first major commercial deal continued into working with other American brands, including Levi's who were the first fashion brand to use a smiley on its jeans in the 1970s.

While other smiling faces had been used in marketing and advertising elsewhere globally, many of them used terms such as "happy face" and "smiling face." Loufrani was not the first documented person to use the term "smiley." By the 1990s, Franklin and his son Nicolas Loufrani held trademarks for the symbol in around 70 countries and had licensed the smiley to brands including Levi Strauss & Co. In 1996, the Loufranis founded the Smiley Company in London, England, built around the Smiley brand. In 1997, Nicolas created hundreds of emoticons, including a 3D smiley logo. His images, registered with the United States Copyright Office in 1997, were first published as GIF files on the internet in 1998, making them the first graphical emoticons used in technology. He launched the SmileyWorld brand shortly thereafter. In the early 2000s, the company licensed the rights to their emoticons to telecom companies, including Nokia, Motorola, Samsung, amongst others. Nicolas Loufrani compiled his graphical emoticons, along with other existing images used for communication, into an online dictionary which was divided into categories, and by 2002, the dictionary included over 3,000 images.

In 1997, The Smiley Company filed a trademark application with the United States Patent and Trademark Office. In 2001, Walmart opposed the registration, citing potential confusion between their design and Loufrani's. Nine years later, the USPTO initially sided with Walmart, before another federal court case was brought forward by Smiley in 2009. In 2011, the companies settled out of court.

In 2005, the company announced the creation of the Smiley World Association, later renamed Smiley Fund and now Smiley Movement, as a charitable arm of the company, to which it donates 10 percent of its profits. In 2017, the company was responsible for 210 million products, that were sold under partnership and licensing agreements.

License Global magazine listed the company as one of the most influential brands of the 2010s in its December 2020 summary of the brands of the decade list. In early 2021, it was announced that The Smiley Company had produced a short film about the history of the Smiley in the run-up to the 50th anniversary since it was created by Franklin Loufrani.

As part of the firm's 50th anniversary celebration since The Smiley was created by Franklin Loufrani in 1972, the licensing company announced numerous collaborations throughout 2022. This included a pen collection with Montegrappa,

In 2023, The Smiley Company hired a firm that specialized in anti-piracy, and filed a SAD lawsuit in the United States District Court for the Southern District of Florida against over 700 Etsy sellers for using the word "smiley." In addition to 11 other SAD lawsuits against sellers on other online platforms. The Smiley Company had registered the trademark for the term in the United States in 2002. Etsy has faced repeated criticism for its lack of action on copyright infringement, with notable lawsuits from Taylor Swift, The Academy of Motion Picture Arts and Sciences, and the BBC. The Smiley Company stated in VICE magazine that the issue had been ongoing for over three years and that they would continue discussions directly with Etsy, dropping the lawsuit in the process. Around the same period of time, Smiley continued with collaborations in the beauty industry, announcing a eyeshadow palette with Urban Decay.

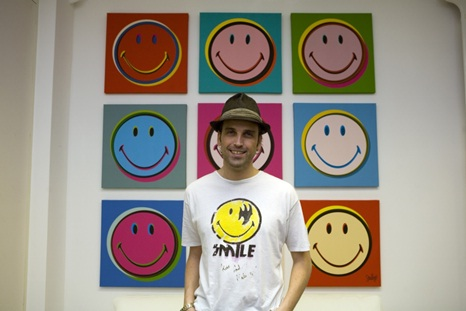
Nicolas Loufrani, CEO of The Smiley Company

== Smiley fashion ==
Smiley began to operate as a London-based fashion house and brand in 2007, formed as a subsidiary of The Smiley Company. The brand quickly grew its presence through a variety of partnerships with major designers. The partnerships would often follow a similar pattern with Smiley being used by the partnering-fashion house as part of a seasonal or one-off design. Some of the biggest names in fashion have used Smiley in their designs from 2007 onwards. This included the Moschino campaign, "Smiley for Moschino". The fashion partnerships were either one-off seasonal collections or more regular collaborations. Many fashion collaborations in the 2010s focused on apparel partnerships, and towards the end of the decade this expanded into other connected industries. Aside from diversifying into other products and industries, SmileyWorld began to partner with more prestigious brands on fashion projects. LOEWE for example, announced a major partnership with the Smiley fashion brand in 2020.

In addition to apparel, Smiley has formed partnerships with the beauty industry. In May 2022, Ciaté London released a collection of five beauty products in collaboration with Smiley, including a lip gloss. In 2025, Smiley announced a fragrance collaboration with Carolina Herrera, launching a rose perfume with smiley branding.

A large number of collaborations were announced for The Smiley Company's 50th anniversary. It included a partnership with Paris-based diamond jeweller Messika, which produced a 7.90 carat necklace, featuring Smiley. They also released a handbag partnership with Fossil, a bomber jacket with Raf Simons,

In 2017, Smiley partnered with Crocs to create Smiley Jibbitz, charms which could be worn on Crocs. They partnered again in 2021 with a smiley designed croc shoe. By 2022, the fashion division of Smiley Company generated €200 million in sales annually.

=== Richard Mille watch ===
In 2022, Smiley partnered with luxury watch maker Richard Mille to produce one of its most valuable collaborations. It was for Smiley's 50th anniversary, producing a limited run of 50 watches. The sale price of the watches was 1.1M euros, their value skyrocketed due to their uniqueness and also rarity. In October 2025, one of the watches was the target of professional jewel thieves in Canberra, Australia. They pair of criminals flew from France to Australia, targeting £5 million in luxury items, with the Smiley x Richard Mille watch as the most expensive item that was stolen from the Canberra home. Both thieves were later arrested, with valuations putting the watch's value at £2.5 million. Journalists suggested that the pair of criminals had flown into Australia specifically to steal the watch. The watch has been listed for 3.4 million euros by Chrono24.
