= Thomas Smiley =

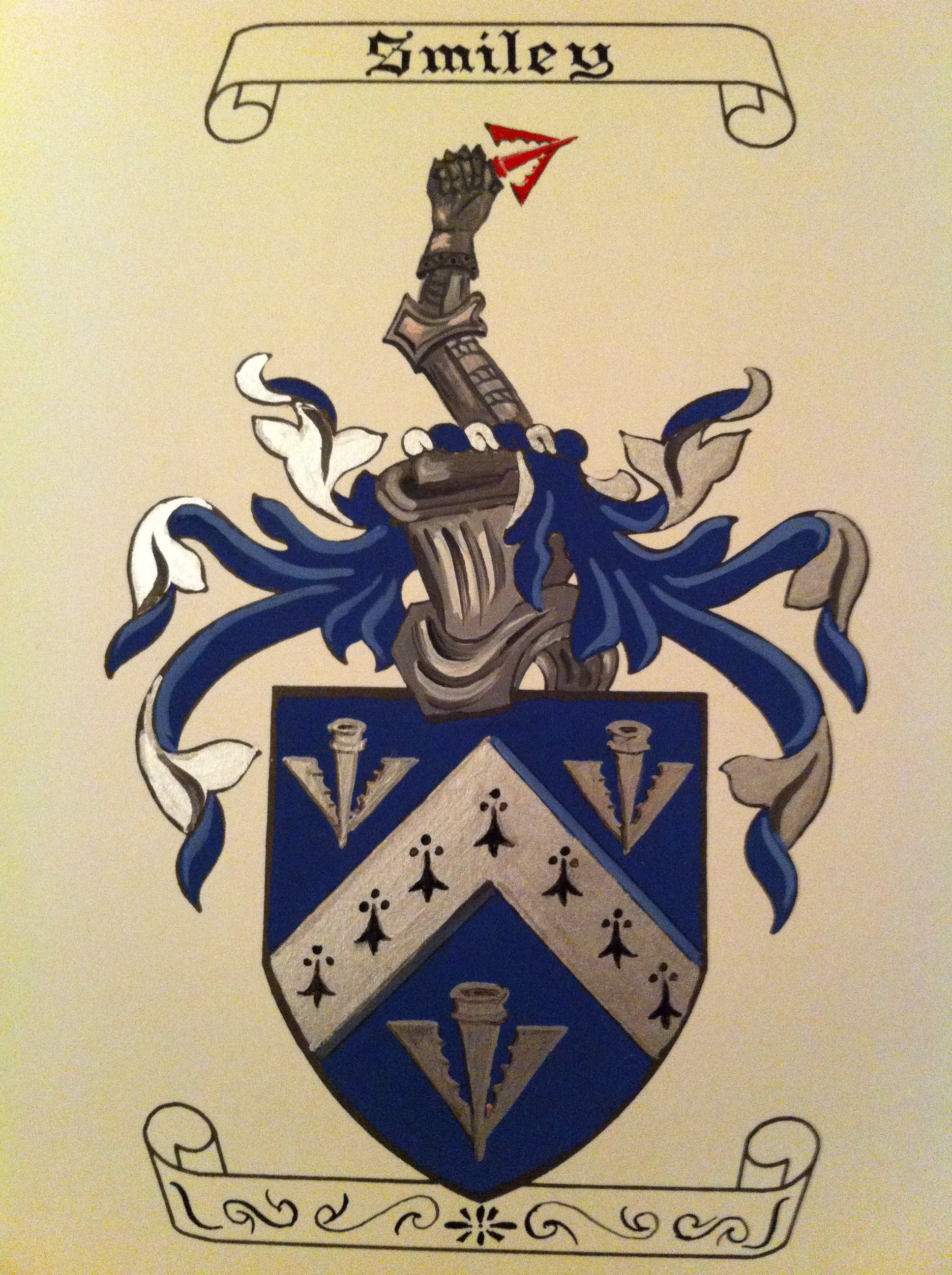
- Smiley Armorial Ensign
- Born: c1660 Lanarkshire, Scotland
- Died: 1689; Derry, Ireland
- Occupation: Williamite Defender
- Known for: Siege of Derry

Smiley Ensign draft with motto
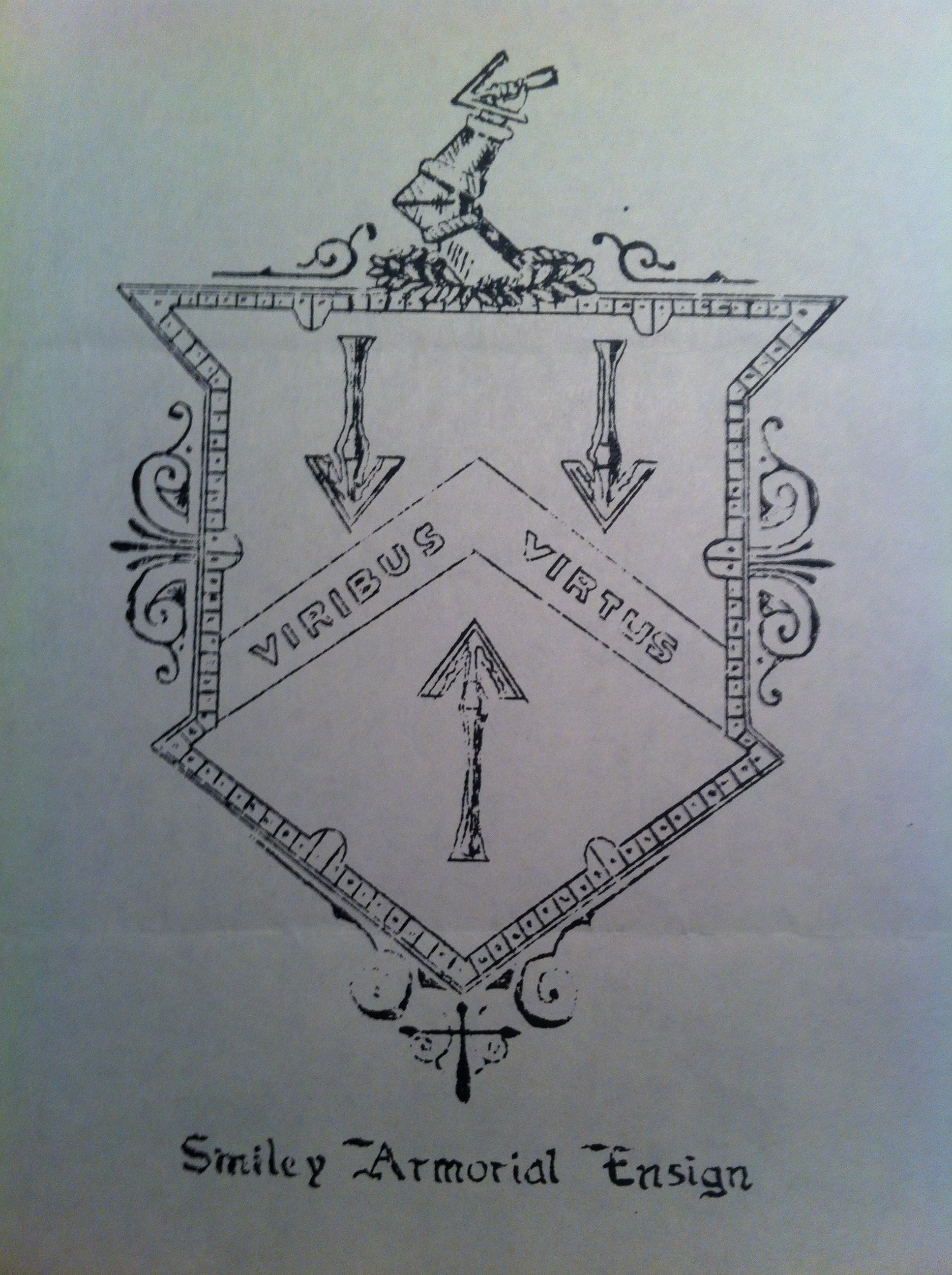
- "Viribus Virtus"
- Known for: Siege of Derry

Thomas Smiley (c. 1660 – 1689) was a Williamite defender during the Siege of Derry.

== Family ==
Thomas Smiley was the son of Presbyterian Minister Thomas Smiley (born c. 1630) in Scotland. Minister Smiley moved his family to County Donegal, Ireland about 1670 as part of the Plantation of Ulster.

Thomas Smiley (the son) married his wife Ann (1663-1731) in about 1679, and they had four children; John, Rose, William, and Francis. Rose remained in Ireland, while the three sons set sail for America in the early 1700s.

== Origin ==
The Smiley Family originated from Lanarkshire, Scotland; where their surname was Smylie, Smyly or Smaillie, and other versions exist as well. The family name changed to Smiley in Ireland, as family members settled near Derry in the 17th century.

== Death ==
Thomas Smiley died in battle during the Siege of Derry in 1689. As a Williamite defender of the city, he helped to prevent the fall of the city to King James II, which allowed time for the Royal Navy of William III of England to arrive and lift the siege.

== Recognition ==
In recognition of Thomas's courage in battle, the Smiley Family was awarded an Armorial Ensign by William Hawkins, Esq., Ulster King of Arms about 1700.

This ensign was confirmed and duly recorded in 1815 by the Crown; through Sir William Betham, Knight Deputy of Ulster, King of Arms.

Key elements of the ensign include: a Chevron (insignia) which denotes military valour, an armoured arm upon the Crest (heraldry) which signifies strength or power, and iron dart heads Pheon indicating defence of Crown property.

The motto of the crest "Viribus Virtus" translates as "Valor in Arms" or "Virtue with Power".

== Descendants ==
Despite the fact that Thomas Smiley died in battle, his legacy extends through his three sons that settled in America in the 1700s. They established the bloodlines that subsequently have grown to many thousands of Smiley descendants.

John Smiley settled in Pennsylvania, William Smiley settled in Virginia, and Francis Smiley settled in New Hampshire.

Several sons of these settlers served as soldiers in the American Revolutionary War.

== Biography ==
Thomas Smiley's biography was written by Oliver H. White in 1949. This biography was compiled into the book Genealogy of Smiley family and descendants (1971) by Jane Myrtle Hinkhouse, which may be found in the Library of Congress. In addition, the Library of Congress produced a microfilm record of this book in 1985.

The biography details the notability of Thomas Smiley which was recorded by the Crown of England following the Siege of Derry in 1689.

== See also ==
- Irish heraldry
- James II of England
- Scotch-Irish Americans
- Ulster Scots people
