= Abbey Church of Sainte-Foy =

Church in Conques, France

- French: Abbatiale Sainte-Foy de Conques; Occitan: Abadiá de Santa Fe de Concas
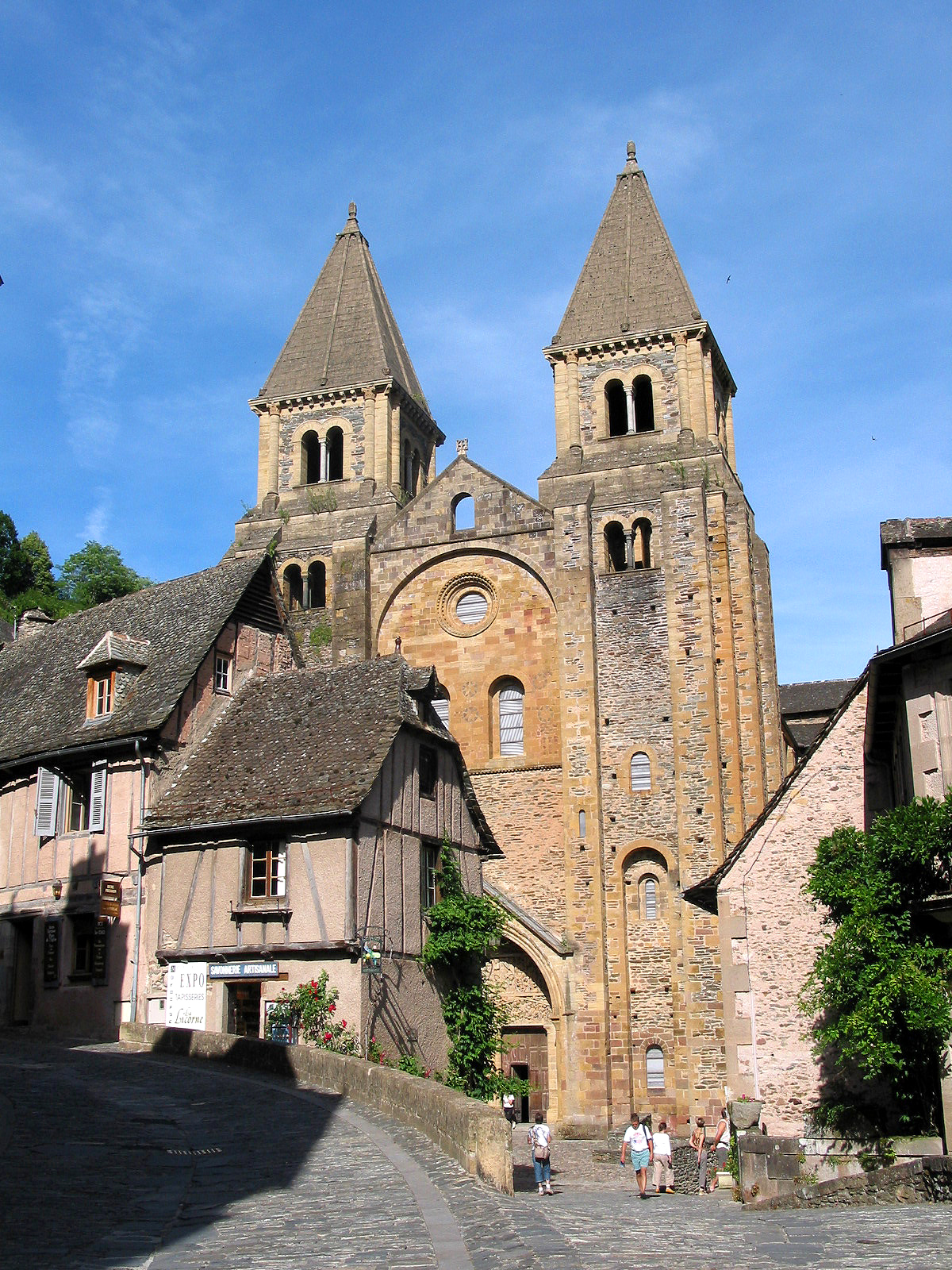
- Abbey Church of Sainte-Foy
- 44°35′57″N 2°23′53″E
- Location: Conques, Aveyron
- Country: France
- Denomination: Roman Catholic
- Tradition: Roman Rite
- Religious institute: Order of Canons Regular of Prémontré
- Website: https://abbaye-conques.org/

History
- Status: Parish and pilgrimage church
- Dedication: Saint Faith

Architecture
- Functional status: Active
- Architectural type: Basilica
- Style: Romanesque
- Years built: 11th–12th centuries 1482–1493: original towers

Specifications
- Length: 59 metres (193 ft 7 in)
- Width: 35 metres (114 ft 10 in)
- Height: 26.40 metres (86 ft 7 in)
- Materials: Stone

Administration
- Diocese: Diocese of Montauban

Monument historique
- Official name: Ancienne abbaye Sainte-Foy
- Type: Classé
- Designated: 1840
- Reference no.: PA00093999

UNESCO World Heritage Site
- Designated: 1998
- Part of: Routes of Santiago de Compostela in France
- Reference no.: 868-038

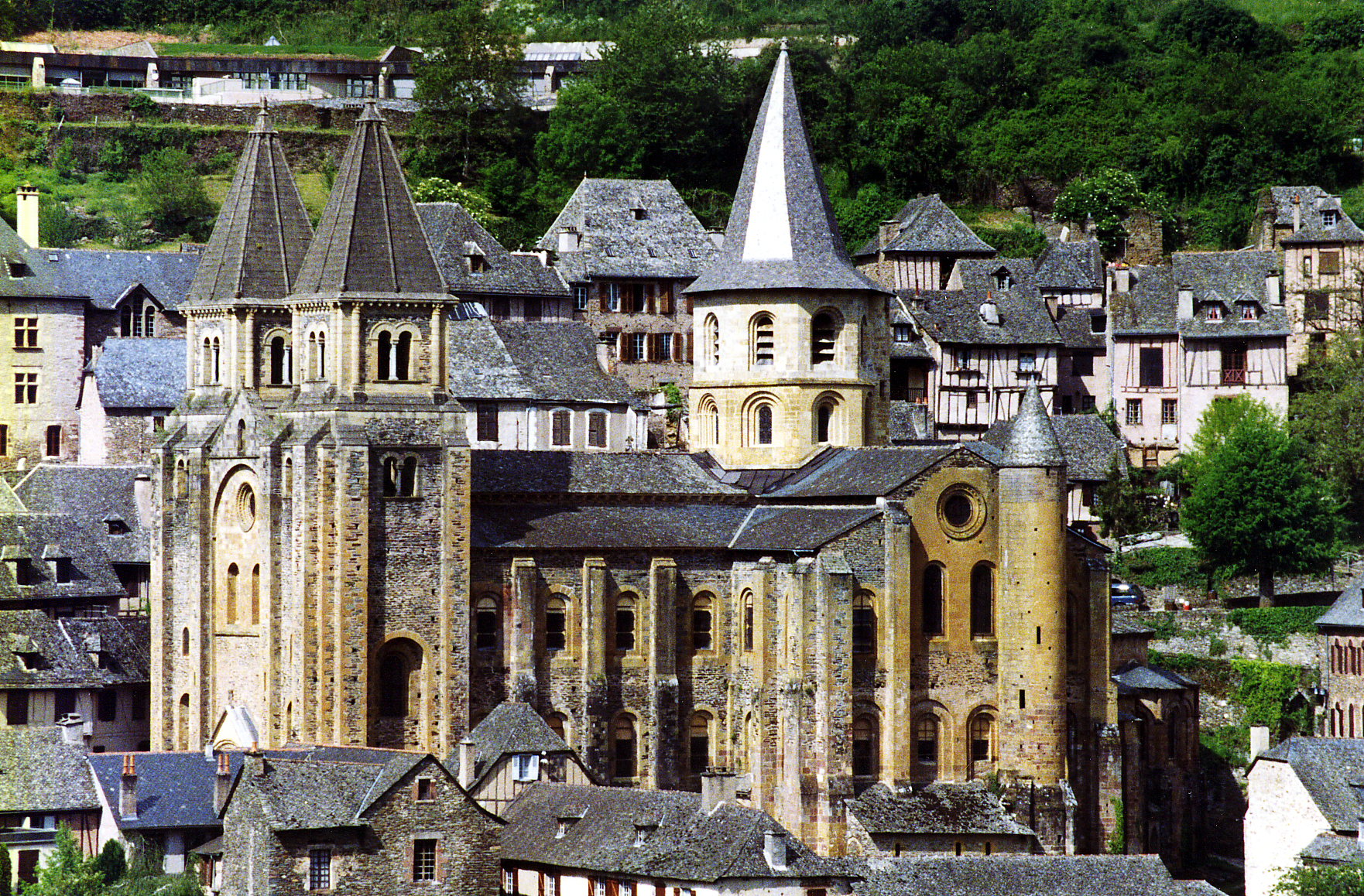
The Sainte-Foy abbey-church in Conques

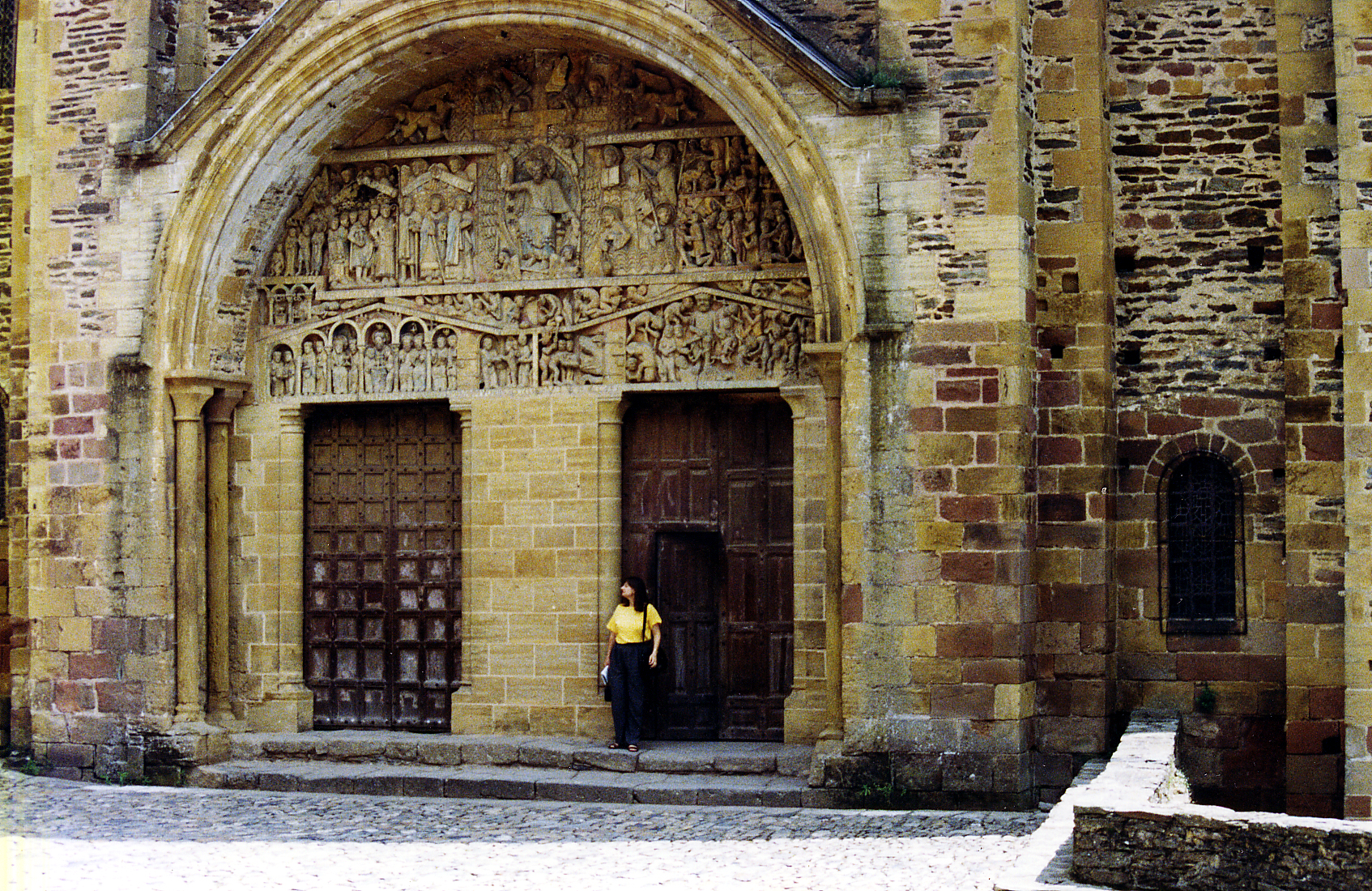
Church doors and tympanum

The Abbey Church of Sainte-Foy in Conques, France, was a popular stop for pilgrims traveling the Way of St. James to Santiago de Compostela, in what is now Spain. The main draw for medieval pilgrims at Conques were the remains of Sainte Foy, a young woman martyred during the fourth century. The relics of Sainte-Foy arrived in Conques through theft in 866. After unsuccessful attempts to acquire the relics of Saint Vincent of Saragossa and then the relics of St. Vincent Pompejac in Agen, the abbey authorities set their sights on the relics of Sainte-Foy at the ancient St. Faith's Church, Sélestat. The Conques abbey opened a priory next to the shrine in Sélestat. A monk from Conques posed as a loyal monk in Agen for nearly a decade in order to get close enough to the relics to steal them.

Beginning in the 13th century, the abbey began to fall into decline as Saint Faith's popularity was elipsed by that of other saints and due to Conques' marginal location. The abbey was confiscated from the Benedictine order in 1537 by order of the Bishop of Rodez, Georges d'Armagnac, and given to a chapter of regular canons. In 1568, during the Wars of Religion, the Protestants seized Conques and burnt down much of the abbey, including parts of the church, most notably the original towers. The abbey experienced a brief revival in the 17th century, however, further destruction occurred due to the Revolution and the subsequent banishment of the canons, resulting in quarrying the buildings by the then-impoverished villagers. Thanks to the work of individuals such as Prosper Mérimée and Étienne Boissonnade, the building was saved, restored (including the construction of the current towers), and returned to the Premonstratensians who sent monks from Mondaye Abbey. Today, the church remains a functional parish and pilgrimage church while also hosting choral and organ services.

The abbey church has been classified as a national monument of France (French: monument historique classé) since 1840.

== Architecture ==
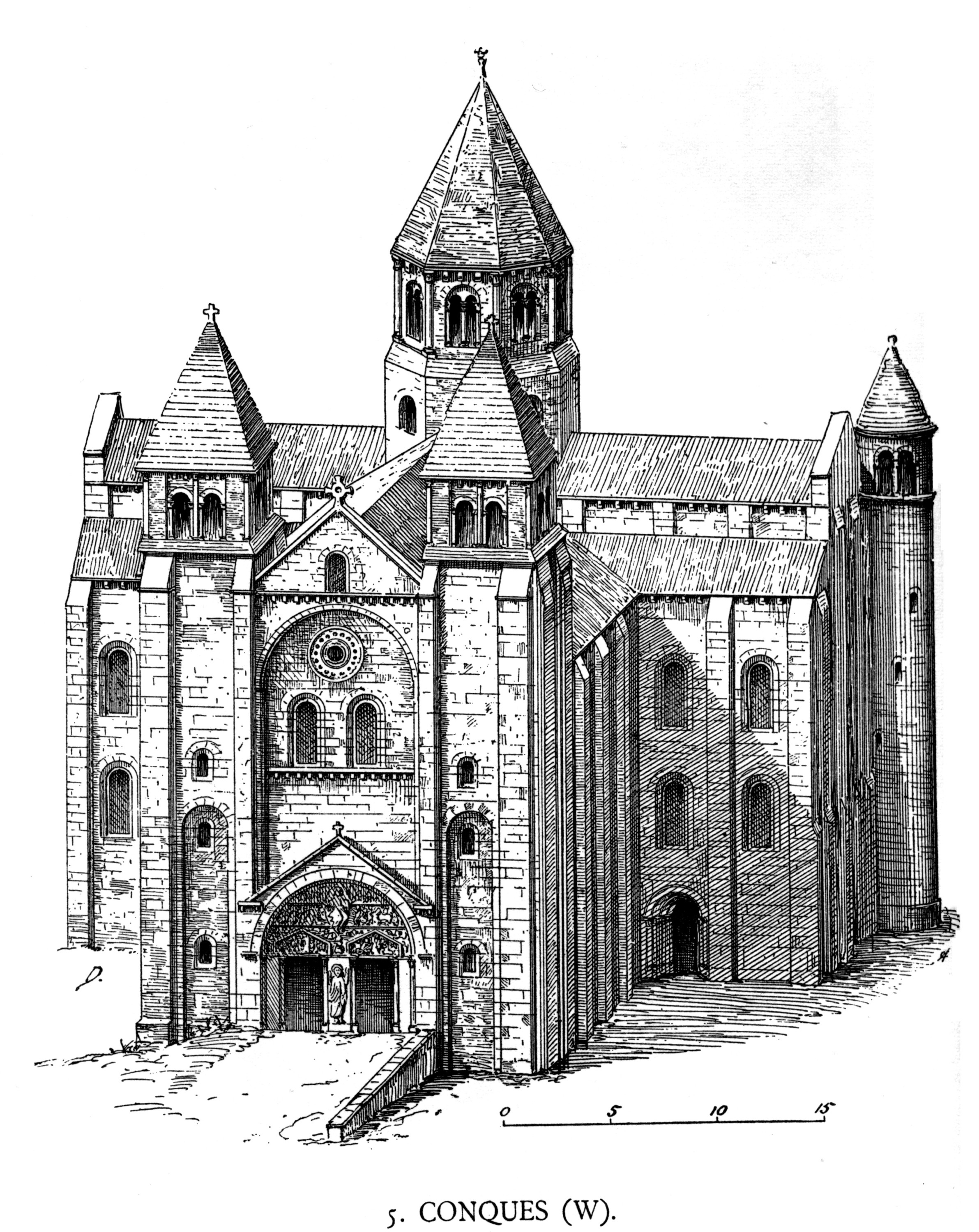
View from the west.

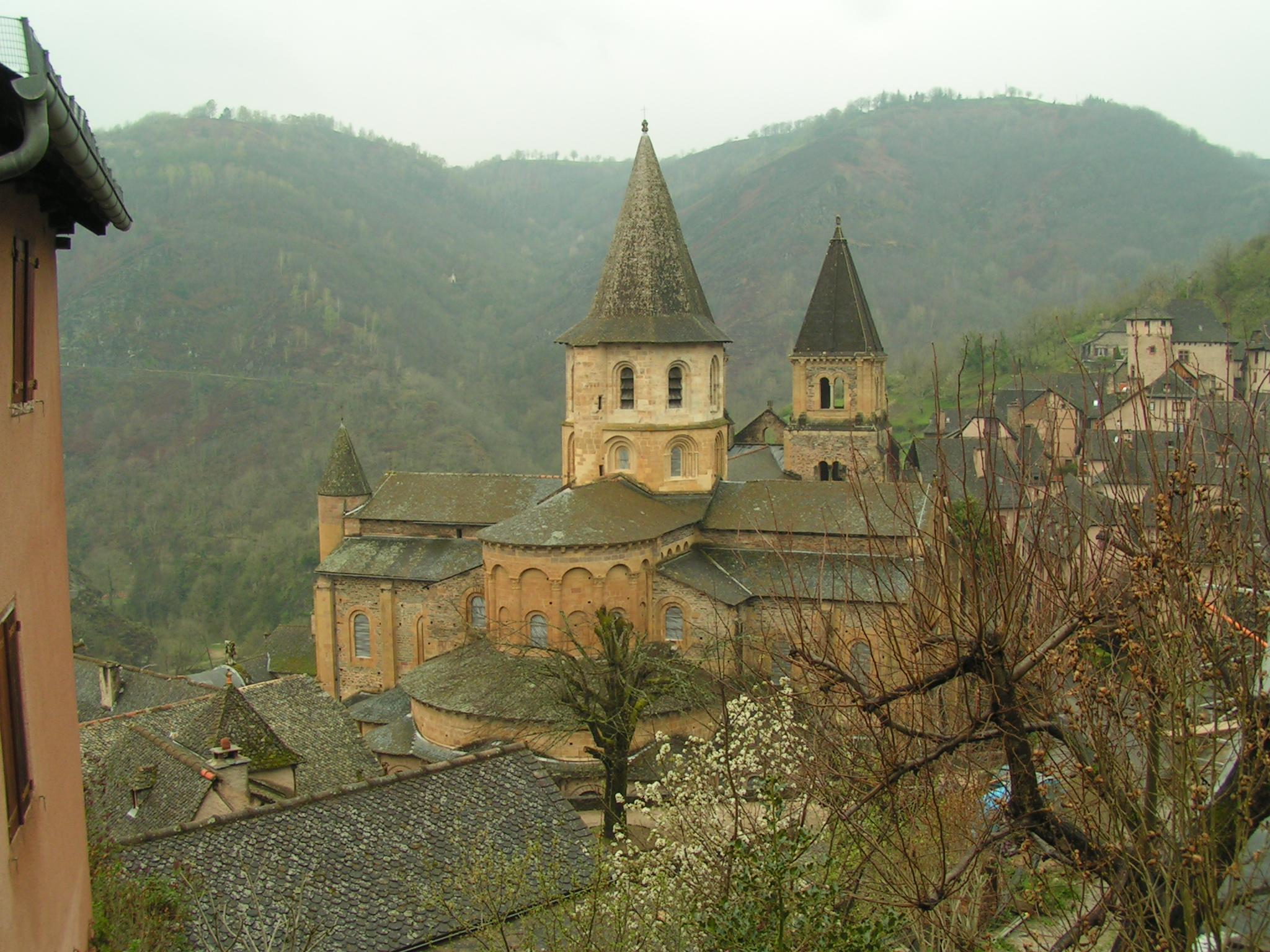

The original monastery building at Conques was an eighth-century oratory built by monks fleeing the Saracens in Spain. The original chapel was destroyed in the eleventh century in order to facilitate the creation of a much larger church as the arrival of the relics of Sainte-Foy caused the pilgrimage route to shift from Agen to Conques. The second phase of construction, which was completed by the end of the 11th century, included the building of the five radiating chapels, the ambulatory with a lower roof, the choir without the gallery and the nave without the galleries. The third phase of construction, which was completed early in the twelfth-century, was inspired by the churches of Toulouse and Santiago de Compostela. Like most pilgrimage churches Conques is a basilica plan that has been modified into a cruciform plan. Galleries were added over the aisle and the roof was raised over the transept and choir to allow people to circulate at the gallery level. The western aisle was also added to allow for increased pilgrim traffic. The exterior length of the church is 59 metres (193 ft 7 in). The interior length is 56 metres (183 ft 9 in), and the width of each transept is 14.80 metres (48 ft 7 in). The height of the crossing tower is 26.40 metres (86 ft 7 in) tall.

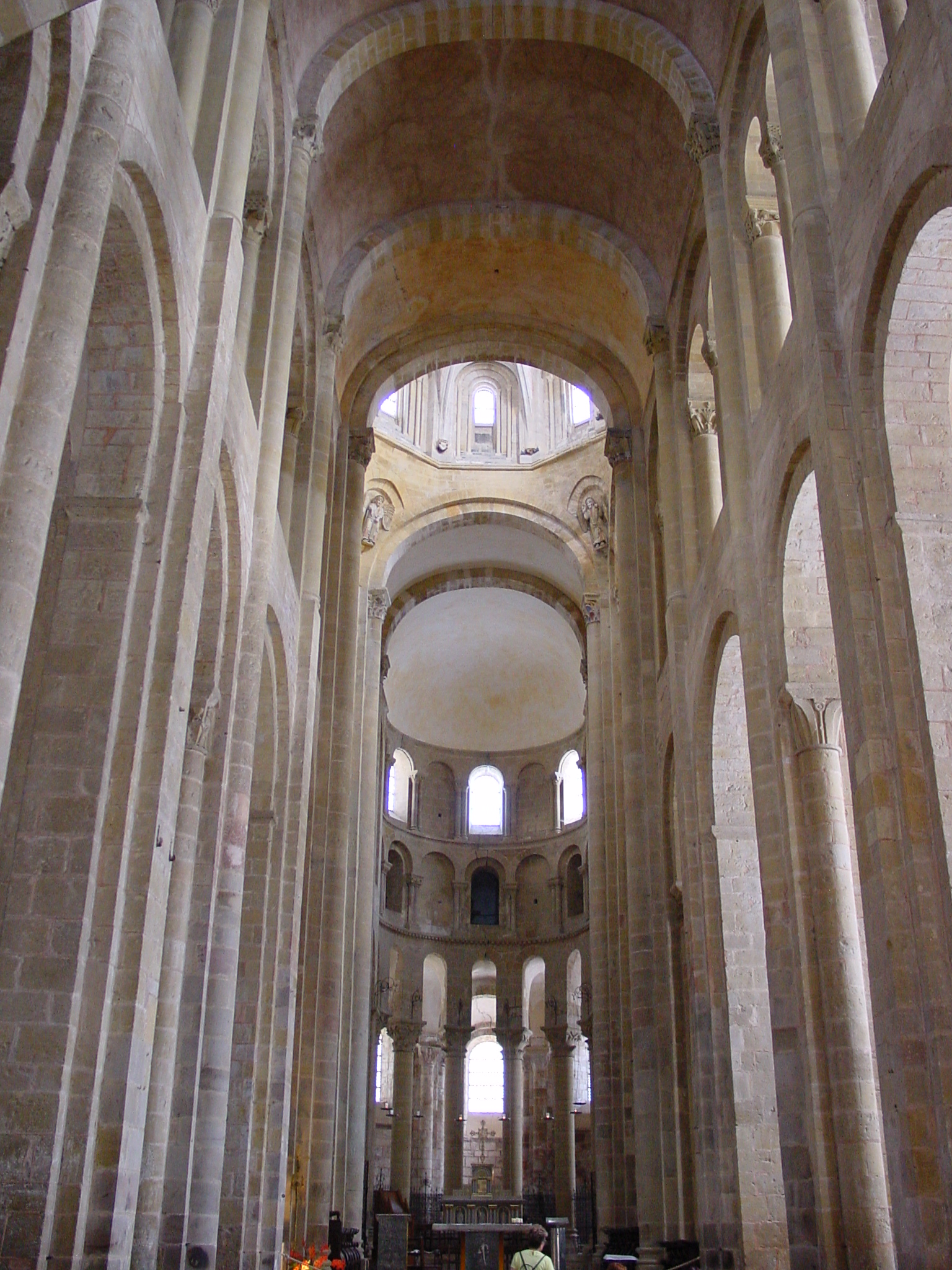
The nave

The arches of the main aisle are simple rounded arches. These arches are echoed in the arches of the gallery which are half of the main arches' height with central supporting piers. Narrower versions of these arches are also found in the apse. The aisle around the apse is separated from the sanctuary by pillars and by the chapels which open up off of the transept. There are three radiating chapels off of the apse and two chapels off of the transept. The side aisles are roofed with a barrel vault that was originally covered with stucco. The nave at Conques is roofed with a continuous barrel vault which is 60 centimetres (24 in) thick. The nave is divided into bays by piers which rise through the gallery and over the barrel vault. The piers of the naves are huge stone blocks laid horizontally and covered with either four half-columns or four pilasters. The interior of the church is 20.70 metres (67 ft 11 in) tall with the sense of verticality being intensified by the repeating pattern of half-columns and pilasters approaching the high altar. The barrel vault's outward thrust is met by the half barrels of the galleries which run the length of the nave and transept.

The crossing dome is a delicate octagon set in square. Ribs radiate out from the center. Figures in the squinches are angels with realistic expressions and animated eyes.

There are 212 columns in Conques with decorated capitals. The capitals are decorated with a variety of motifs including palm leaves, symbols, biblical monsters and scenes from the life of Sainte-Foy. On the fifth capital of the north side of the nave are two intricate and expressive birds. On the corresponding capital on the south side of the nave are flat and lifeless human figures. The figures appear to have a slight hunch, as if they are reacting to the weight of the arches above them. The capitals functioned as didactic picture books for both monks and pilgrims. Traces of color are still visible on a number of the columns.

Light filters into Conques through the large windows under the groin vaults of the aisle and through the low windows under the half barrels of the galleries. The windows in the clerestory and the light from the ambulatory and radiating chapels focus directly onto the high altar. The nave receives direct light from the crossing tower.

The original windows have long since vanished and after WWII the spaces were filled with colourful figurative glass designs. Over time these came to be seen to be at odds with the original spirit of the architecture. In 1986, the artist Pierre Soulages accepted an invitation by the Culture Ministry and the Arts Delegation and Heritage Direction for St.-Foy Abbey-church to design and create 104 windows (95 full windows and 9 oculi) for the building.

Soulages designed abstract, rows of gently bending lines that shift in direction from panel to panel. He created the windows from reconstituted crushed white glass in order to keep the purity and the power of the bay architecture. Pierre Soulages' stained-glass windows are nowadays an integral element of Conques architecture, history and its collective memory "in accordance with the function of this architecture and the emotion felt in this space, agreeing with its purpose of contemplation, meditation and prayer"

The ambulatory allowed pilgrims to glimpse into the sanctuary space through a metal grill. The metal grill was created out of donated shackles from former prisoners who attributed their freedom to Sainte-Foy. The chains also have a number of symbolic meanings including reminding pilgrims of the ability of Sainte-Foy to free prisoners and the ability of monks to free the penitent from the chains of sin. The stories associated with the ability of Sainte-Foy to free the faithful follows a specific pattern. Often a faithful pilgrim is captured and chained about the neck, they pray to Sainte-Foy and are miraculously freed. The captor is sometimes tortured and then dismissed. The liberated pilgrims would then immediately travel to Conques and dedicate their former chains to Sainte-Foy relaying their tale to all who would listen. As stories spread pilgrimage traffic increased.

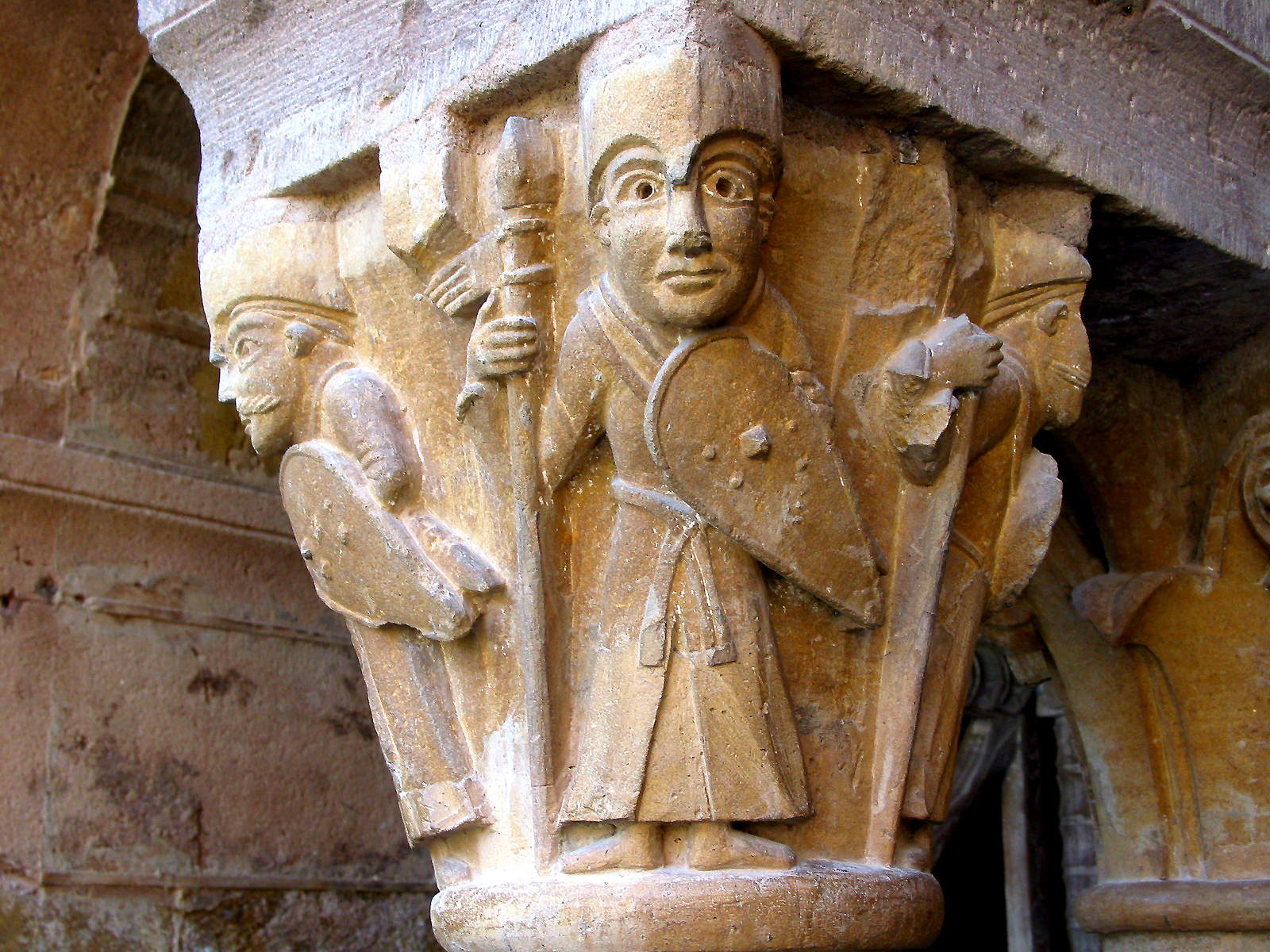
A sculpted capital in the cloister.

There is little exterior ornamentation on Conques except necessary buttresses and cornices. The exception to this is the tympanum located above the western entrance which depicts the Second Coming. As pilgrimages became safer and more popular the focus on penance began to wane. Images of doom were used to remind pilgrims of the purpose of their pilgrimage. The tympanum appears to be later than the artwork in the nave. This is to be expected as construction on churches was usually begun in the east and completed in the west. The tympanum depicts Christ in Majesty presiding over the judgment of the souls of the deceased. The cross behind Christ indicates he is both Judge and Savior. Archangel Michael and a demon weigh the souls of the deceased on a scale. The righteous go to Christ's right while the damned go to Christ's left where they are eaten by a Leviathan and excreted into Hell. The tortures of Hell are vividly depicted including poachers being roasted by the very rabbit they poached from the monastery. The tympanum also provides an example of cloister wit. A bishop who governed the area of Conques but was not well liked by the monks of Conques is depicted as being caught in one of the nets of Hell. The virtuous are depicted less colorfully. The Virgin Mary, St. Peter and the pilgrim St. James stand on Christ's left. Above their heads are scrolls depicting the names of the Virtues. Two gable shaped lintels act as the entrance into Heaven. In Heaven Abraham is shown holding close the souls of the righteous. A pudgy abbot leads a king, possibly Charlemagne, into heaven. Sainte-Foy is shown on the lower left kneeling in prayer and being touched by the outstretched hand of God. Particularly interesting are carvings of the "curieux" (the curious ones), forerunners of the World War II-era cartoon image known as Kilroy, who peek over the edges of the tympanum. The tympanum was inspired by illuminated manuscripts and would have been fully colored; small traces of the color survive today.

== Treasury ==
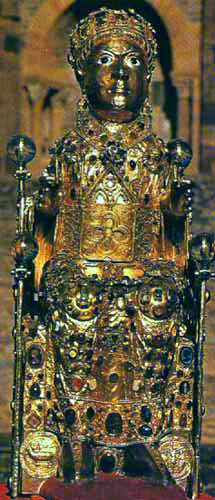
Reliquary of Sainte-Foy.

Conques is the home of many spectacular treasures. One of which is the famous 'A' of Charlemagne. The legend is that Charlemagne had twenty-four golden letters created to give to the monasteries in his kingdom. Conques received his 'A', indicating that it was his favorite. This is only legend; while the 'A' exists, it dates to c. 1100, and no other pieces of Charlemagne's alphabet have ever been found. Conques is also home to an arm of St. George the Dragon Slayer. It is claimed that the arm at Conques is the arm with which he actually slew the dragon.

The golden statue reliquary of Sainte-Foy dominated the treasury of Conques. The reliquary statue itself was of a twelve year old girl who was beheaded for staying loyal to her faith and beliefs. During the Roman persecution of Christians in the fourth century, Foy refused to surrender her devotion to Christianity, even under torture and threats. As written in the Passio, Foy exclaimed, "For the name of my Lord Jesus Christ I have been prepared not only to be threatened but to suffer all kinds of torments," staying true to her exemplary faith. Her strong will ultimately led her to be tortured and burned to death with a hot brazier, a pan made for coal.

Catching a glimpse of the reliquary was the main goal of the pilgrims who came to Conques. The head of the reliquary contains a piece of skull which has been authenticated. The reliquary is a fifth-century Roman head, possibly the head of an emperor, mounted on a wooden core covered with gold plating. Made in the latter half of the ninth-century, the reliquary was 2 feet 9 inches tall. As miracles reportedly increased, the gold crown, earrings, gold throne, filigree work and cameos and jewels, mostly donations from pilgrims, were added. In the fourteenth-century a pair of crystal balls and their mounts were added to the throne. Silver arms and hands were added in the sixteenth century. In the eighteenth-century bronze shoes and bronze plates on the knees were added. There is no one distinct, credited artist for this reliquary because it is a dynamic work of art that changed with the incoming donations to the church over time. The relics themselves were stolen from the nearby town of Agen by the monks of Conques in what was commonly called a furtum sacrum, or holy robbery.

In the aftermath of the French Revolution, the relics and treasures were removed by local residents and hidden nearby, while the sanctuary was converted to a "Temple of Reason."

Upon visiting Conques in 1833, the author and antiquary Prosper Mérimée, then France's Inspector of Historical Monuments found the abbey beyond repair, but inspired thorough restorations of the church. In 1873, Norbertine order (Premonstratensians) were assigned as the Catholic caretakers of the church.

The Sainte-Foy abbey church was added to the UNESCO World Heritage Sites in 1998, as part of the World Heritage Sites of the Routes of Santiago de Compostela in France. Its Romanesque architecture, albeit somewhat updated in places, is displayed in periodic self-guided tour opportunities, especially of the upper level, some of which occur at night with live music and appropriately-adjusted light levels.

== Gallery ==
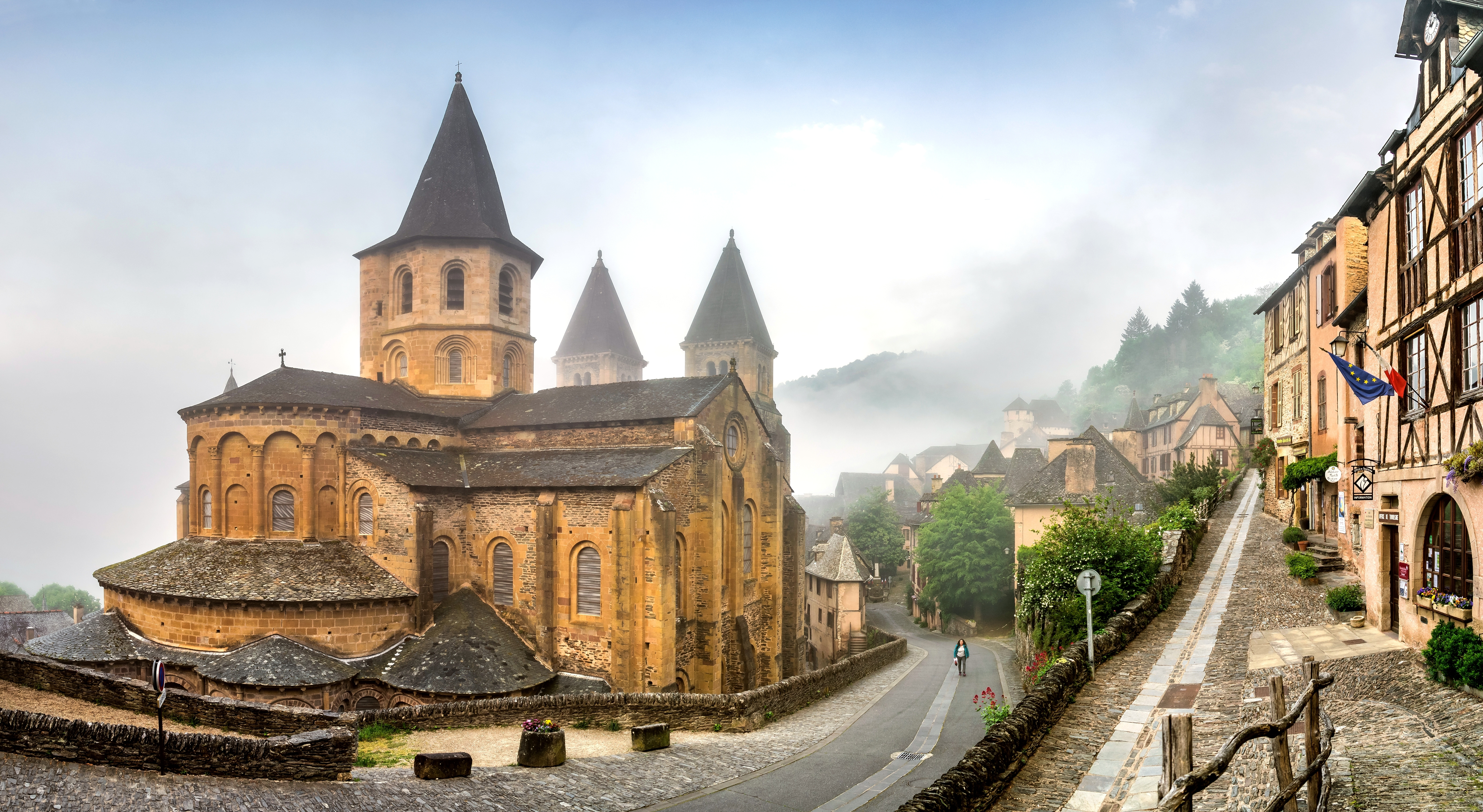

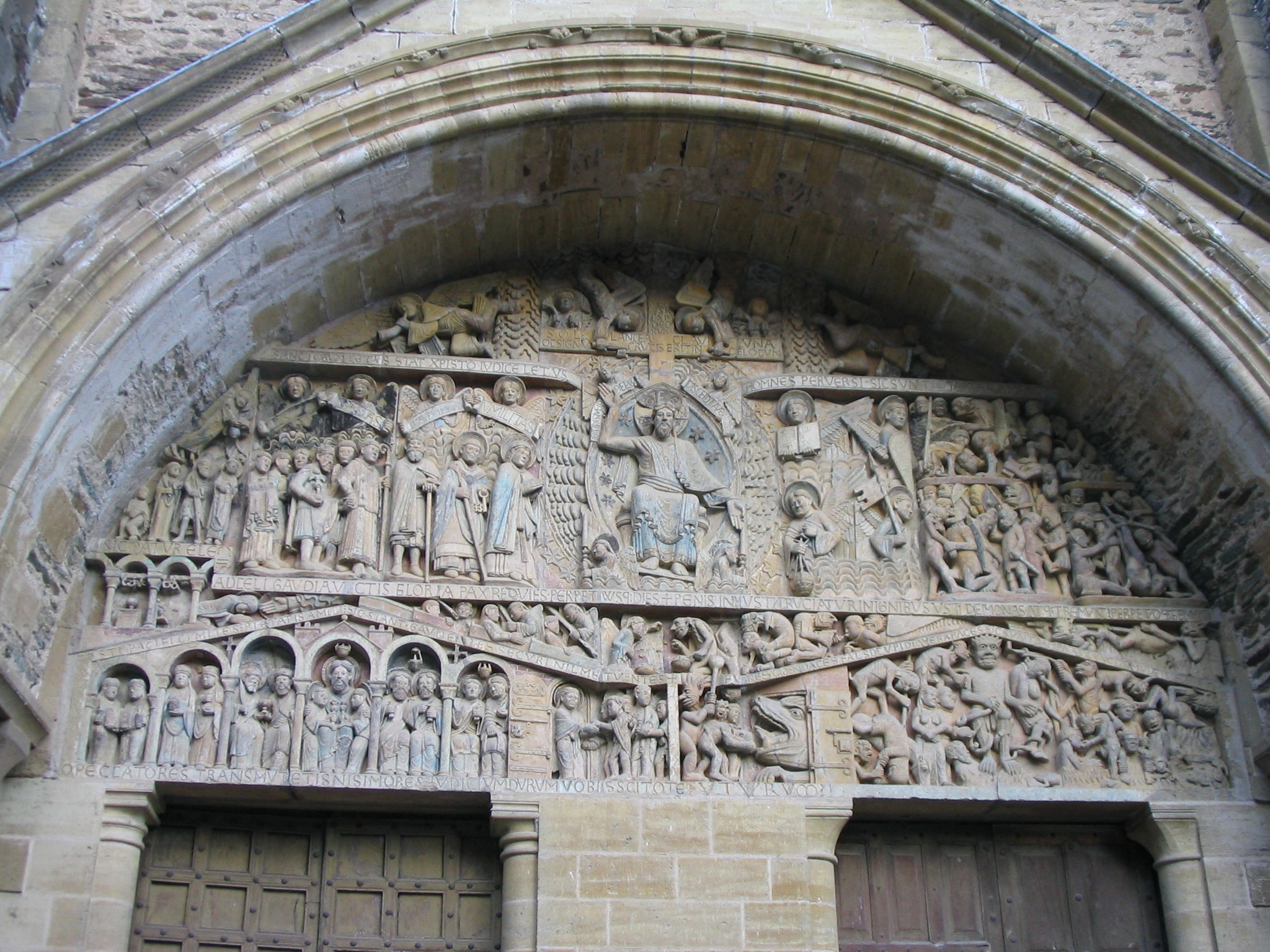
Abbey-church doorway carving

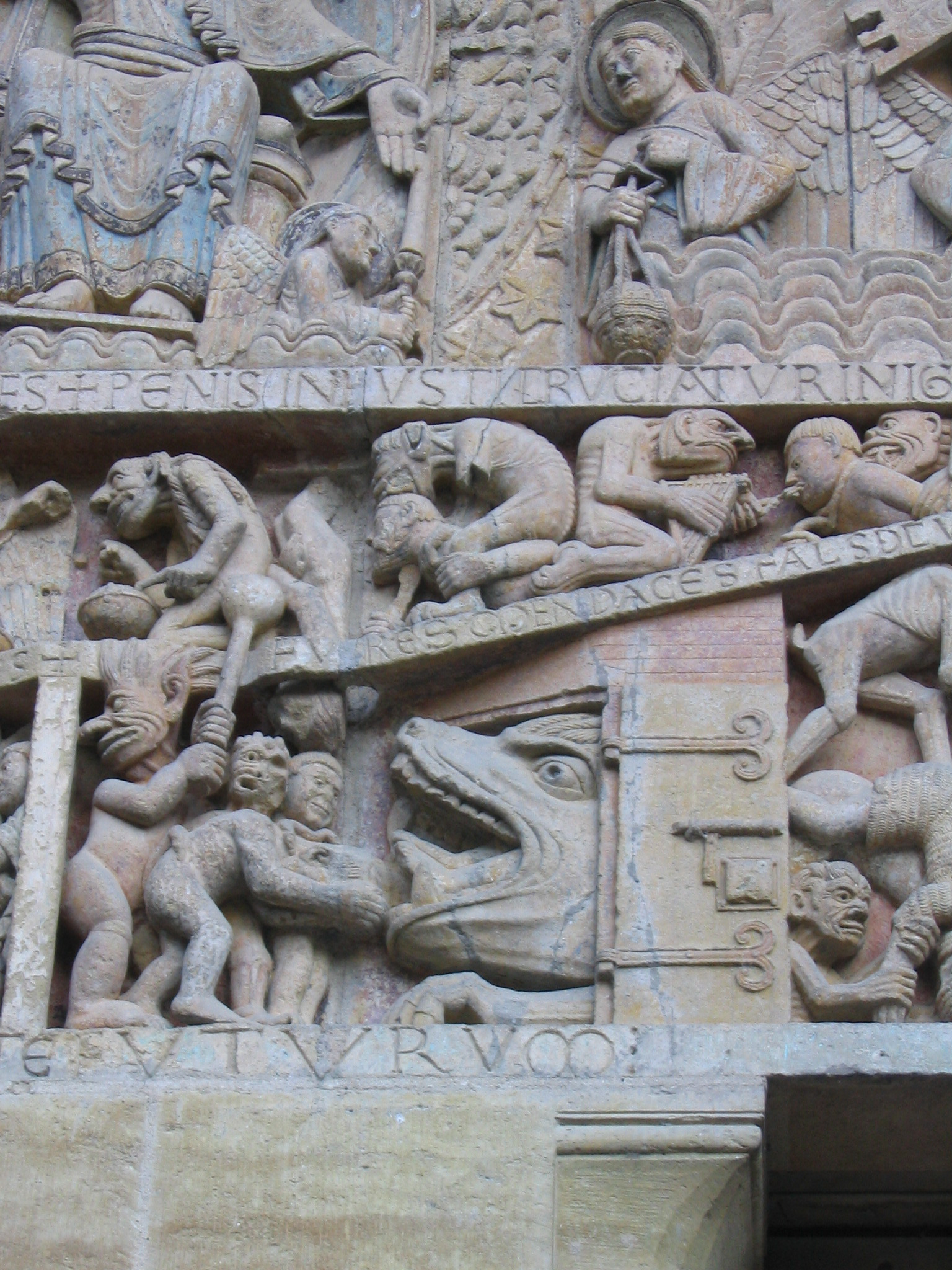
Abbey-church doorway carving detail

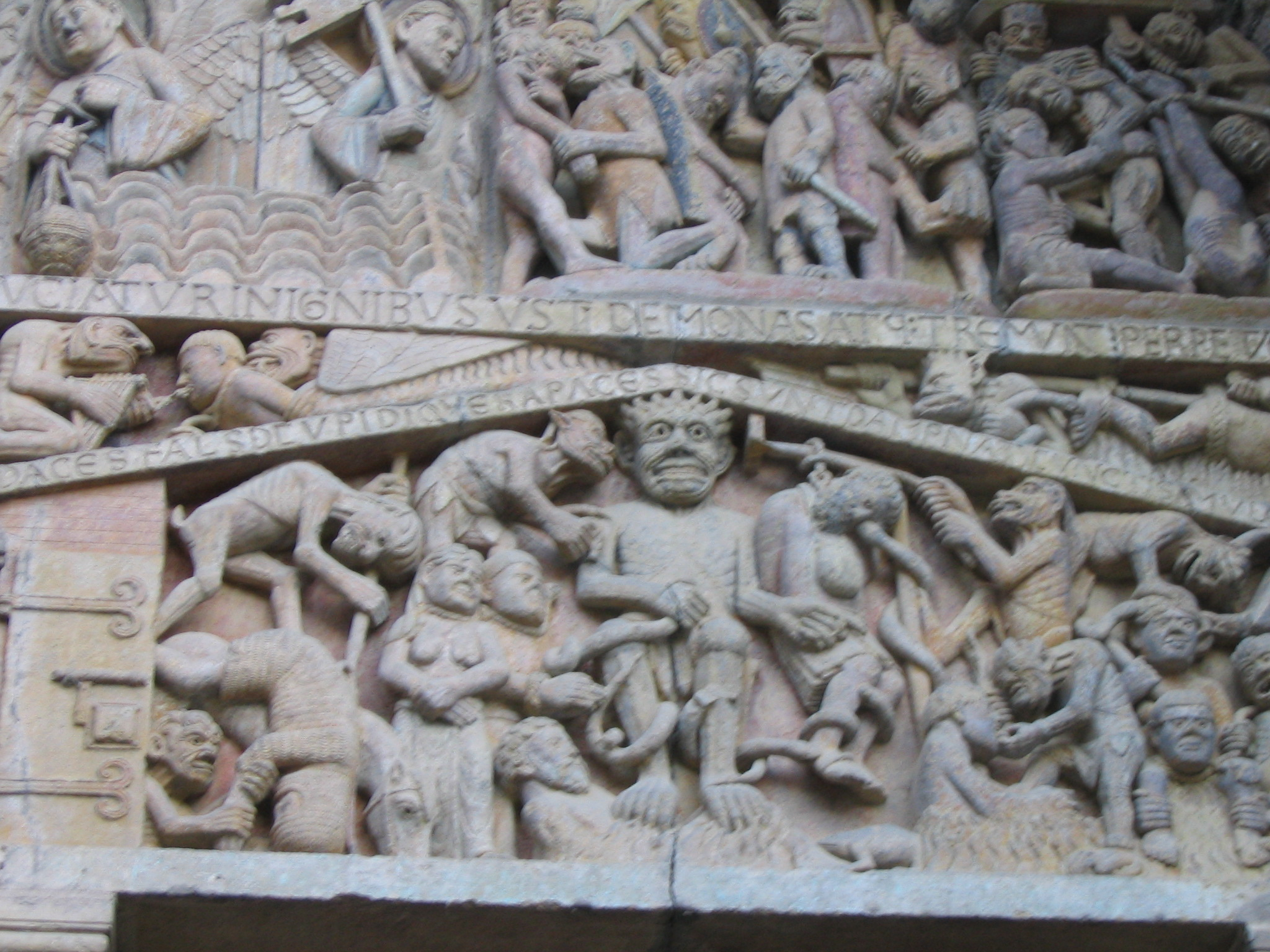
Abbey-church doorway carving detail

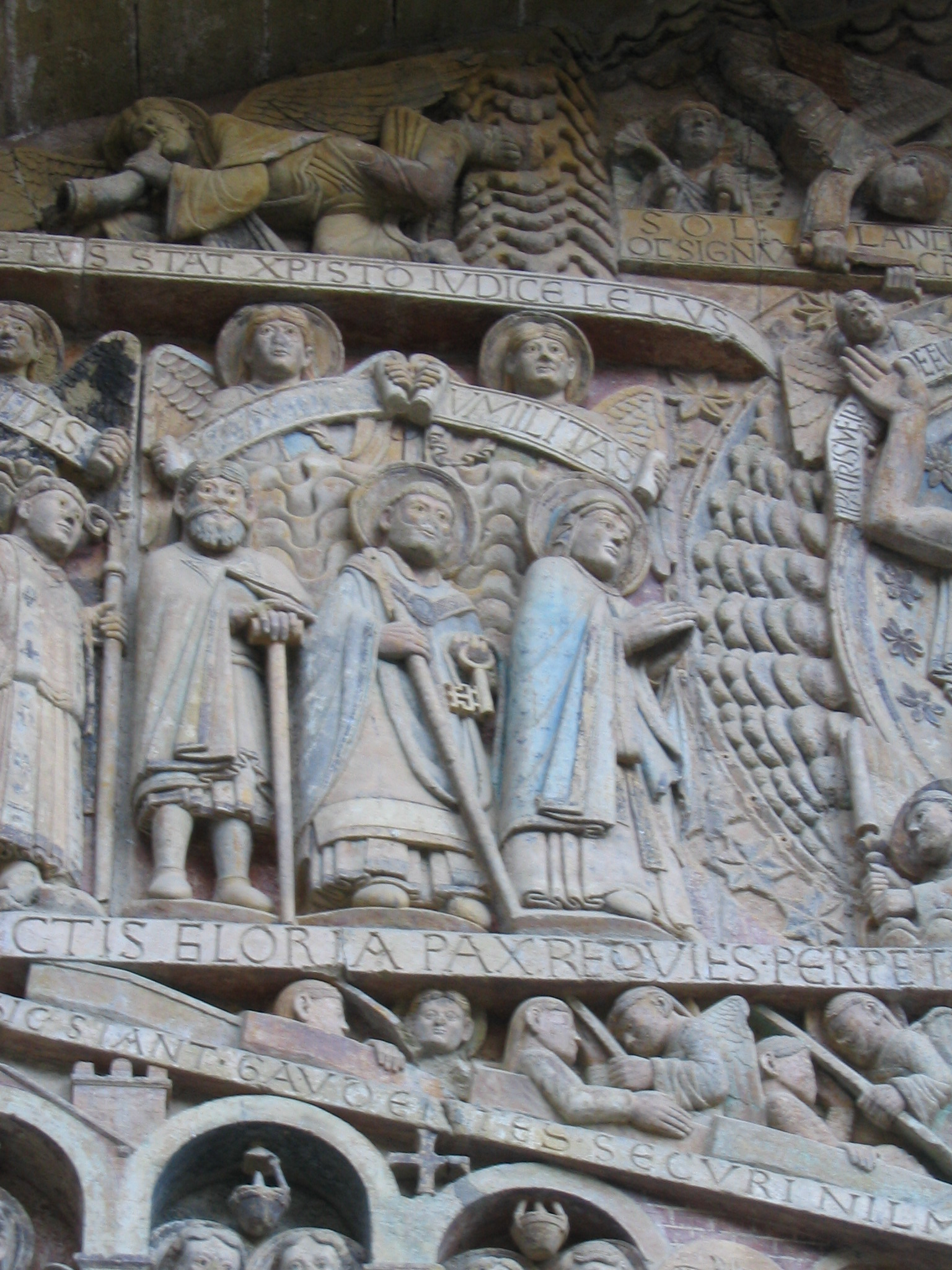
Abbey-church doorway carving detail

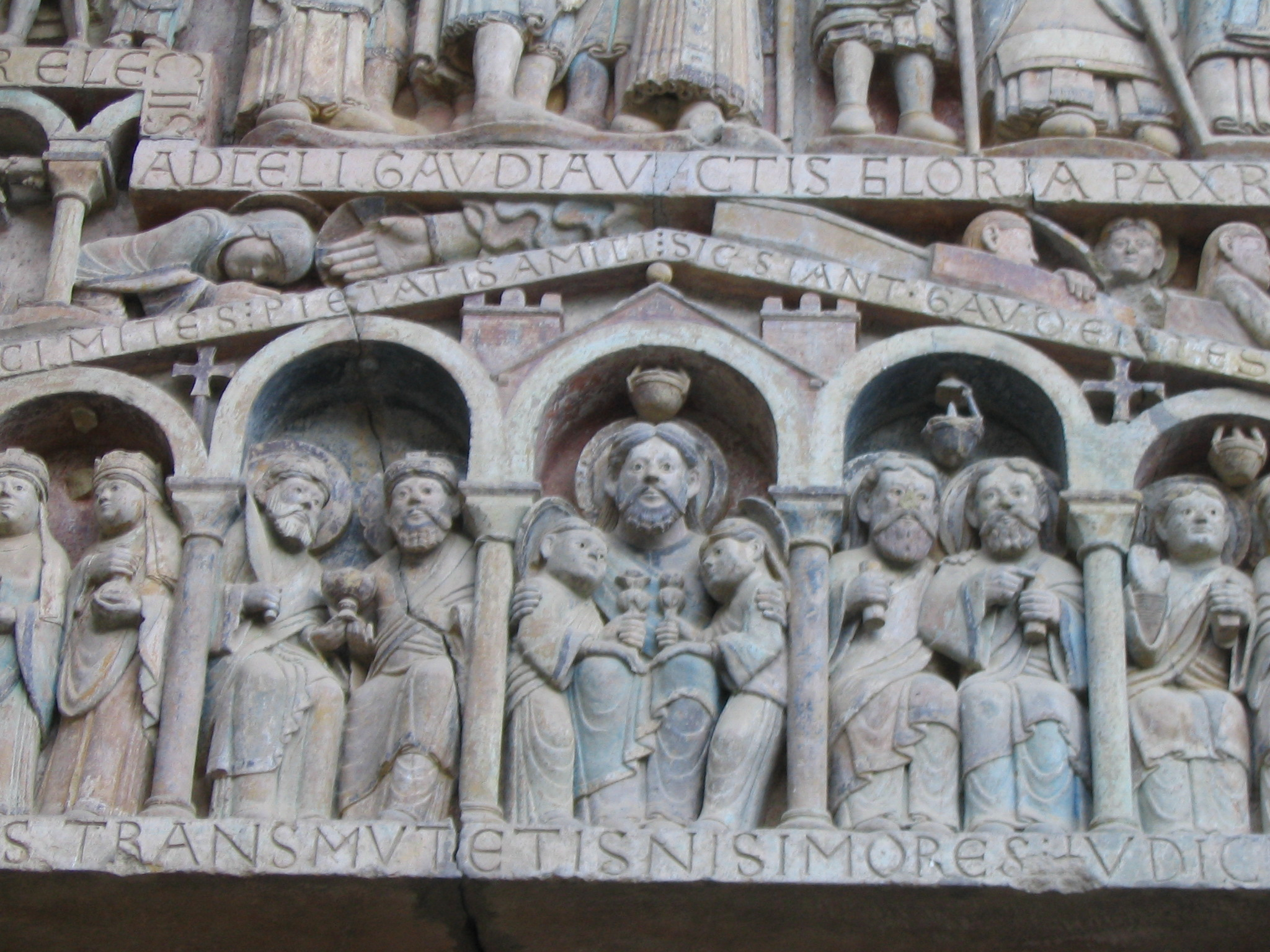
Abbey-church doorway carving detail

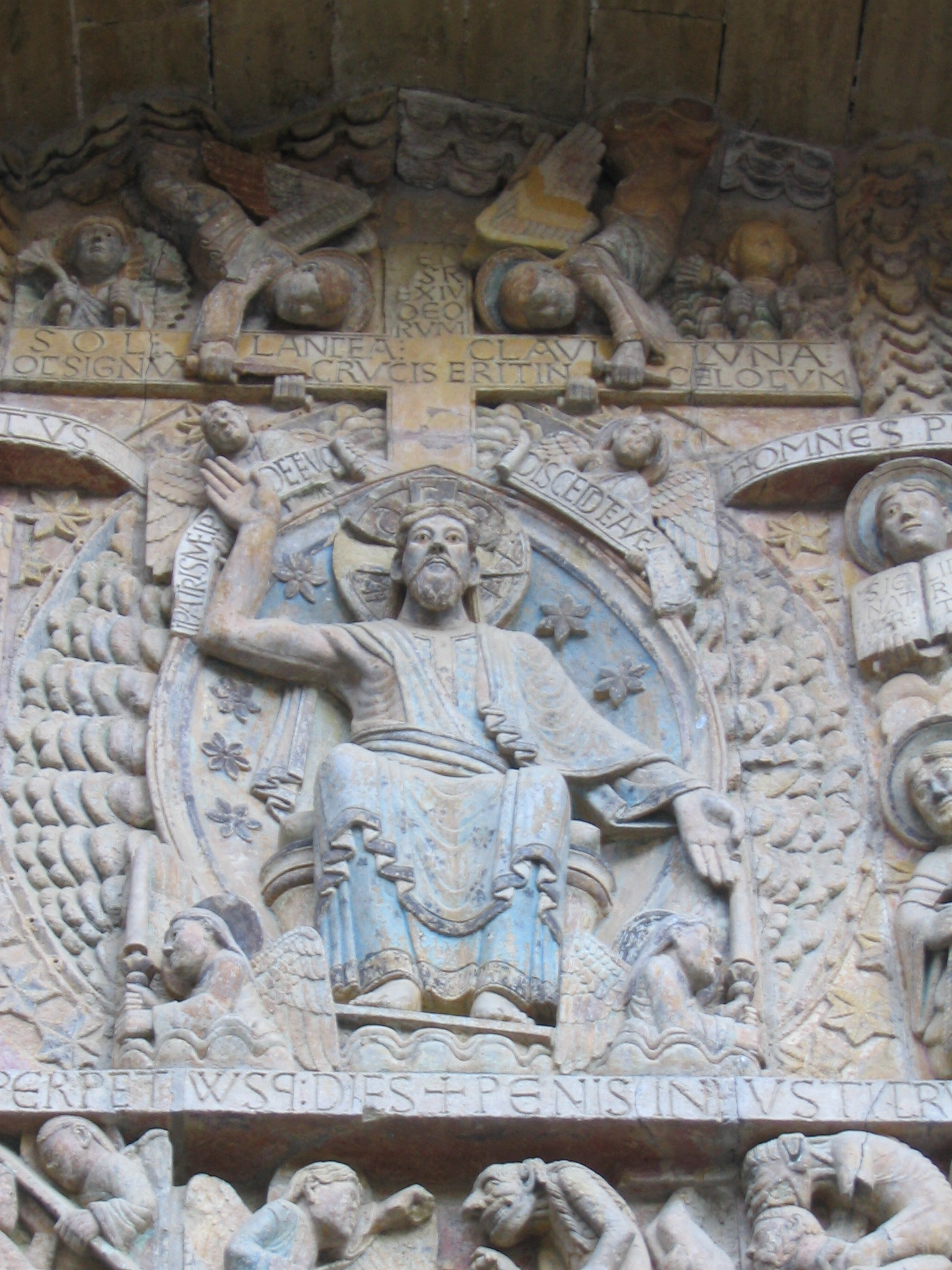
Abbey-church doorway carving detail

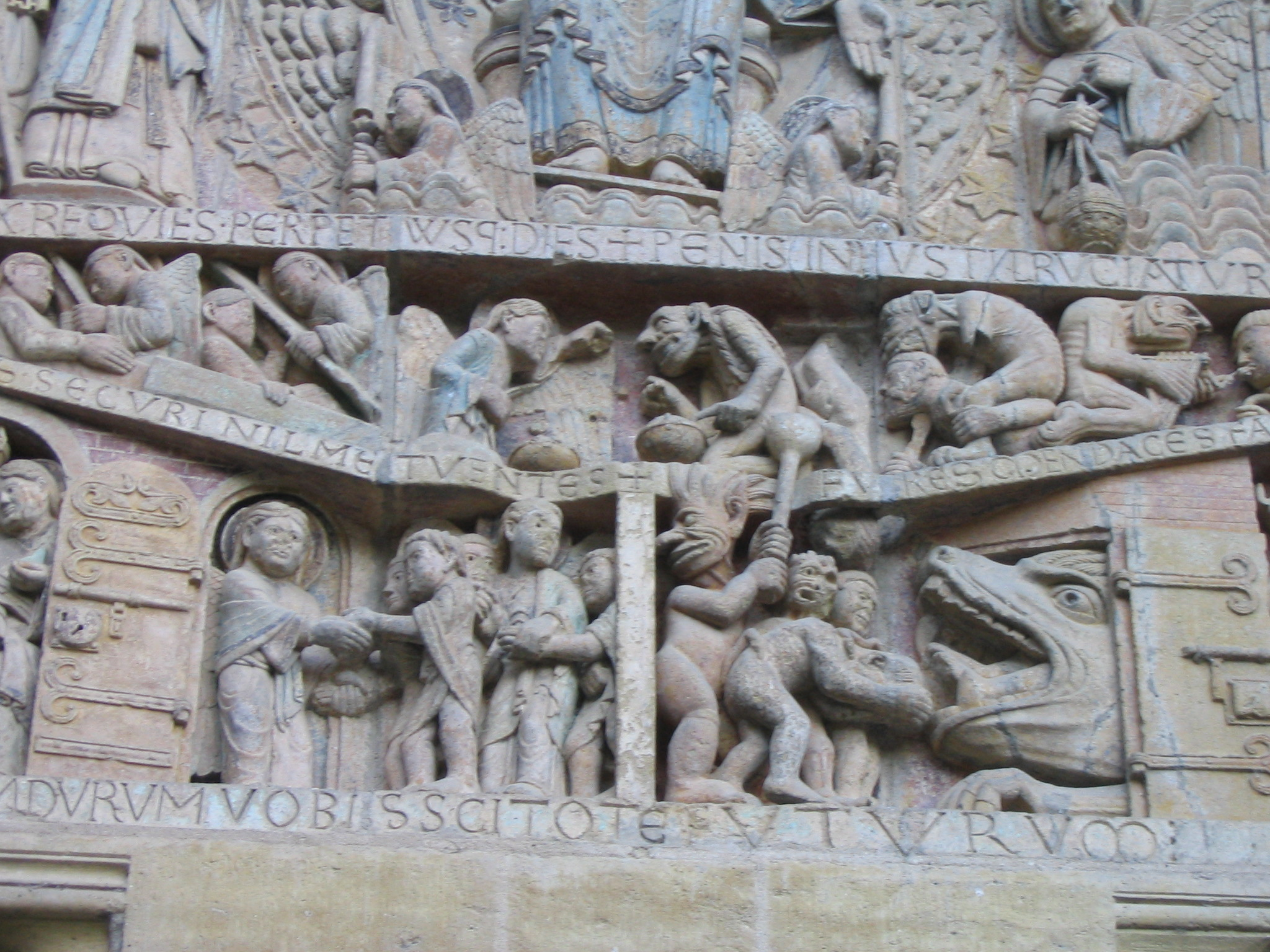
Abbey-church doorway carving detail

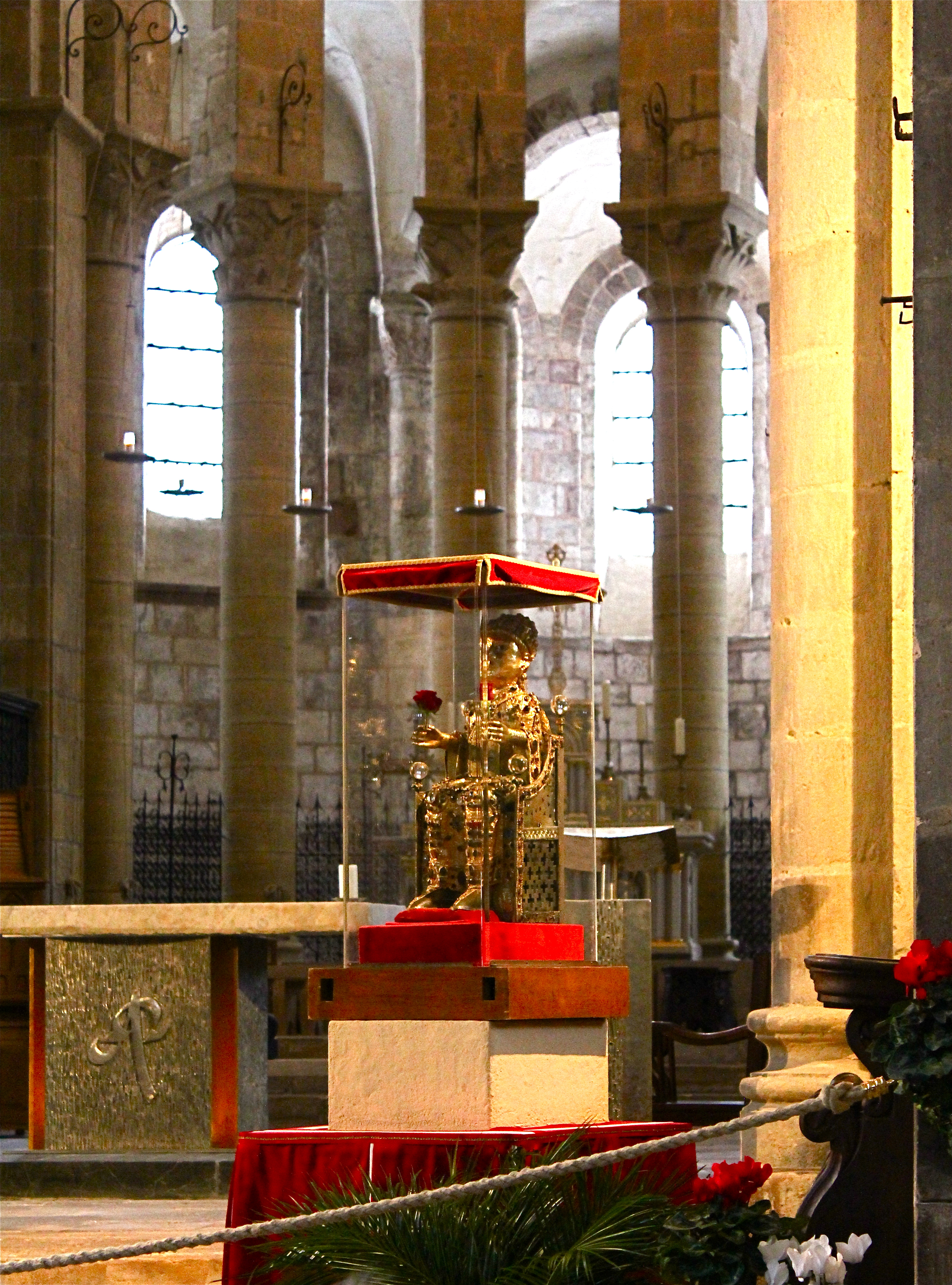
The Majesté de Sainte Foy with roses, on Saint-Foy day (October 2010).

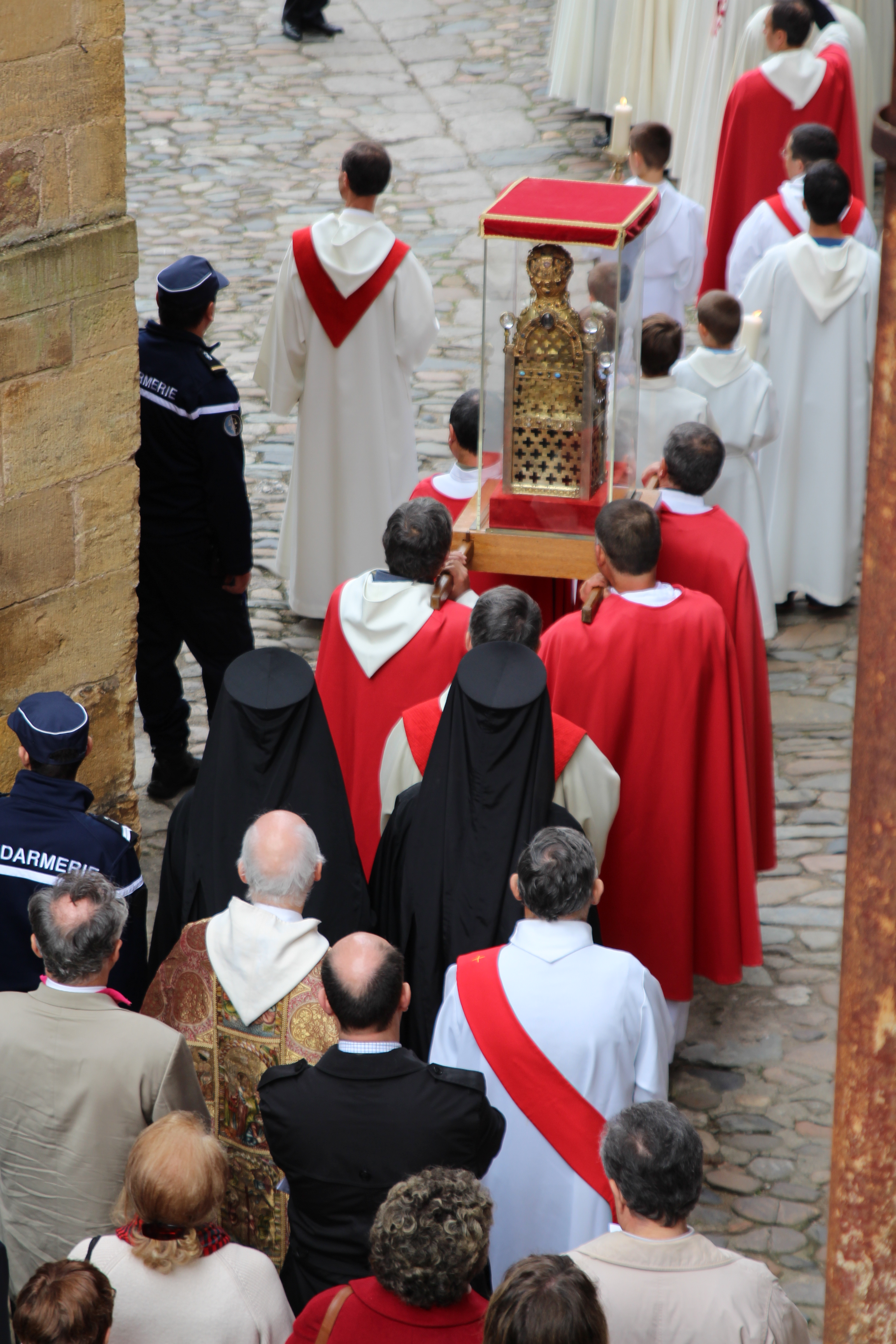
Procession on Saint-Foy day in Conques on October 6, 2013

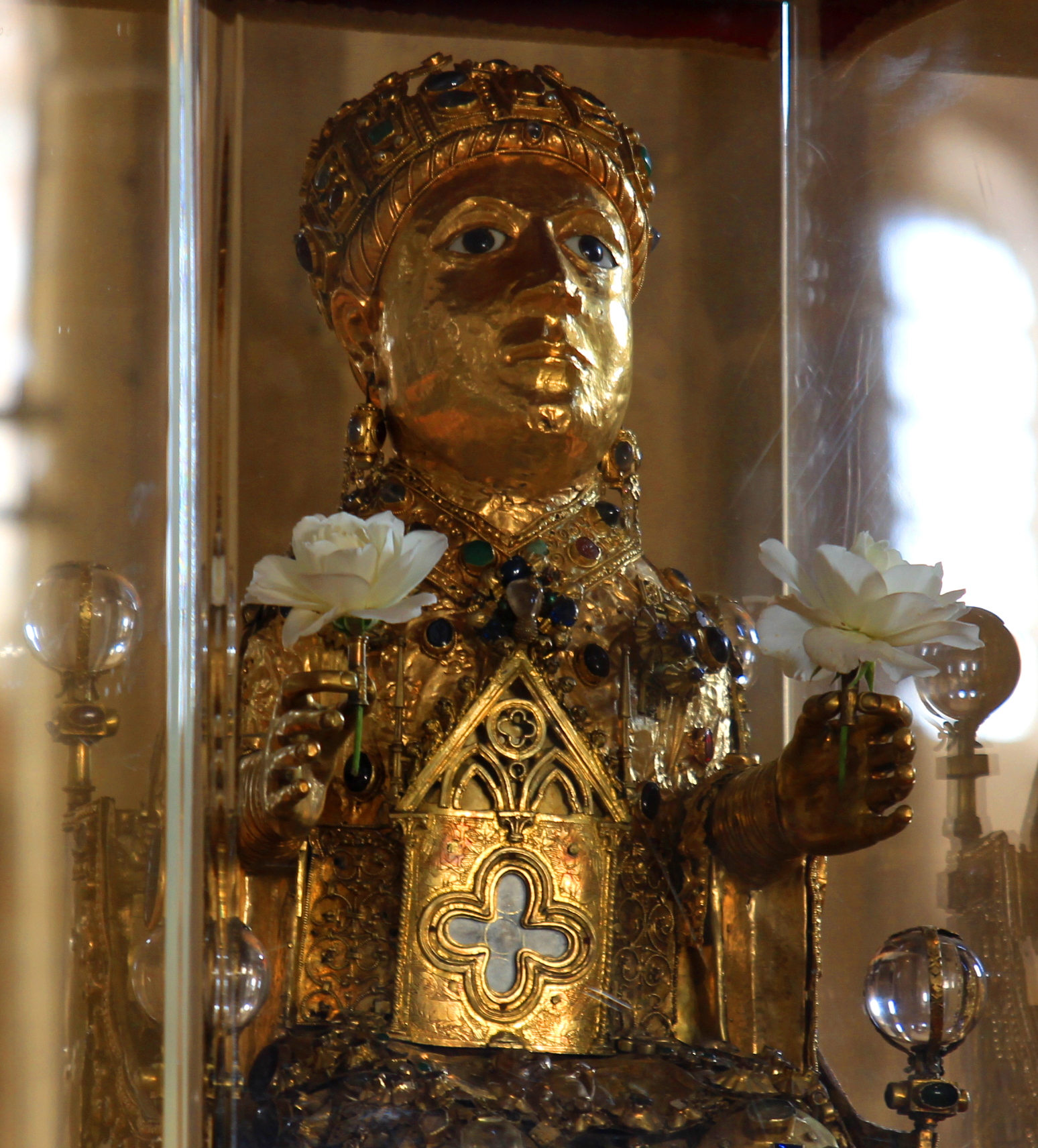
Golden statue reliquary of Sainte-Foy (October 6, 2013)

== See also ==
- High medieval domes
