= John Hamon =

French street artist

- Born: 1982 (age 43–44)
- Known for: Posters
- Notable work: John Hamon poster
- Movement: Street art; Guerrilla

John Hamon (born 1982) is a French street artist known for posting his image on buildings across Paris. Since 2001, he has affixed and projected the image of his identity card photo onto monuments in 33 countries and 77 cities. He describes his motivation as "C'est la promotion qui fait l'artiste ou le degré zéro de l'art" ("It's the promotion that makes the artist or the zero degree of art").

== Posters ==
Hamon began postering the image of his identity card photograph on Parisian walls in 2001. The image itself was taken in 2000, when Hamon was an eighteen-year-old high-school student. Later Hamon projected the image on notable buildings (Palais de Tokyo, Palais-Royal and Bibliothèque nationale de France) and monuments (Eiffel Tower, Arc de Triomphe). Hamon has displayed the image on monuments across the world – such as the Leaning Tower of Pisa – in 33 countries and 77 cities. In April 2019 he projected his image onto the Eiffel Tower. For the most part, Hamon has acted as a guerilla artist postering without permission; he was once arrested for attempting to project onto Notre-Dame de Paris. He was released without charge.

The image is the basis of much of his published works to date.

"John Hamon" posters
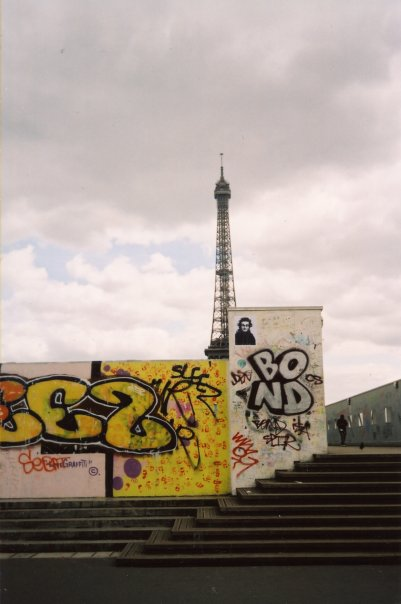
By the Eiffel Tower

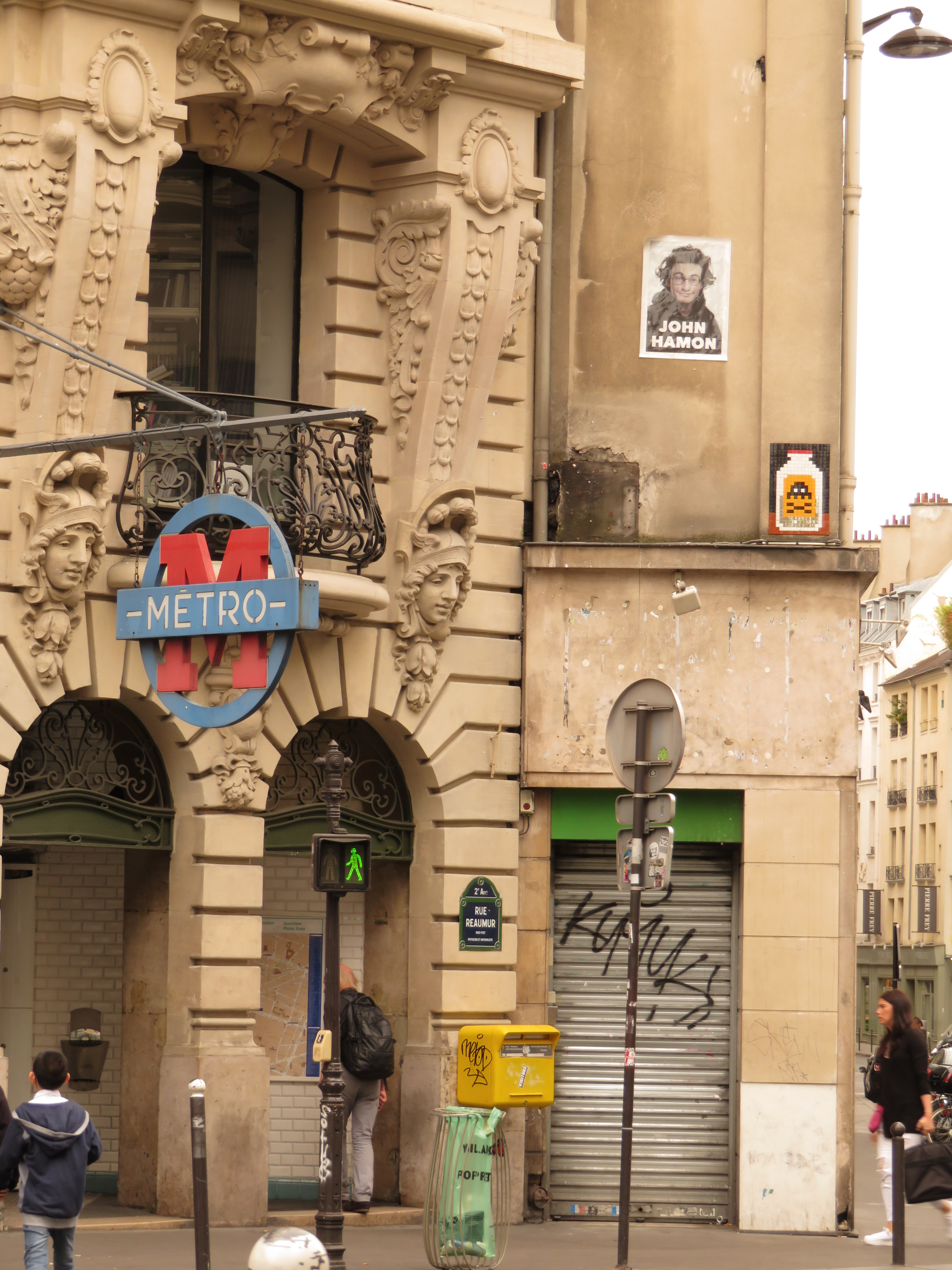
By a Metro station, Paris

== NFT art ==
In the 2020s Hamon staged an upright coffin outside the George Pompidou Center, before having it burned elsewhere. The coffin bore the inscription "John Hamon Killed Contemporary Art." Non-fungible token (NFT) images of both scenes were sold by the artist.

== Criticism ==
Fubiz.net describes Hamon's works and performances as "amusing, and thought-provoking on the importance of promotion in modern art". Leo Mirani of The New Yorker describes Hamon as a 21st-century Kilroy. Journalist Edd Norval, describes Hamon as a man "presenting the ultimate parody", "making the art world the subject of the joke". Les Inrockuptibles' Clément Arbrun, writing for A Nous Paris, sees Hamon as an "omni-present enigma" and likens him to Amélie Poulain, treating his original photo as an example of one of Duchamps ReadyMades, reusing the same image like Andy Warhol's Campbell's Soup Cans.

== Awards and honours ==
- Chaton D'Or – 2018 – Prix du projet artistique (Artistic project prize)
