= James Kilroy =

James Kilroy may refer to:

- James J. Kilroy (1902–1962), American shipyard inspector and politician, believed by some to be the originator of the "Kilroy was here" graffito
- James Kilroy (politician) (1890–1954), Irish Fianna Fáil politician
