= Henohenomoheji =

Face drawn using hiragana characters

Henohenomoheji

Henohenomoheji (Japanese: へのへのもへじ HEH-noh-HEH-noh-moh-HEH-jee) or hehenonomoheji (へへののもへじ) is a face known to be drawn by Japanese schoolchildren using hiragana characters. It became a popular drawing during the Edo period.

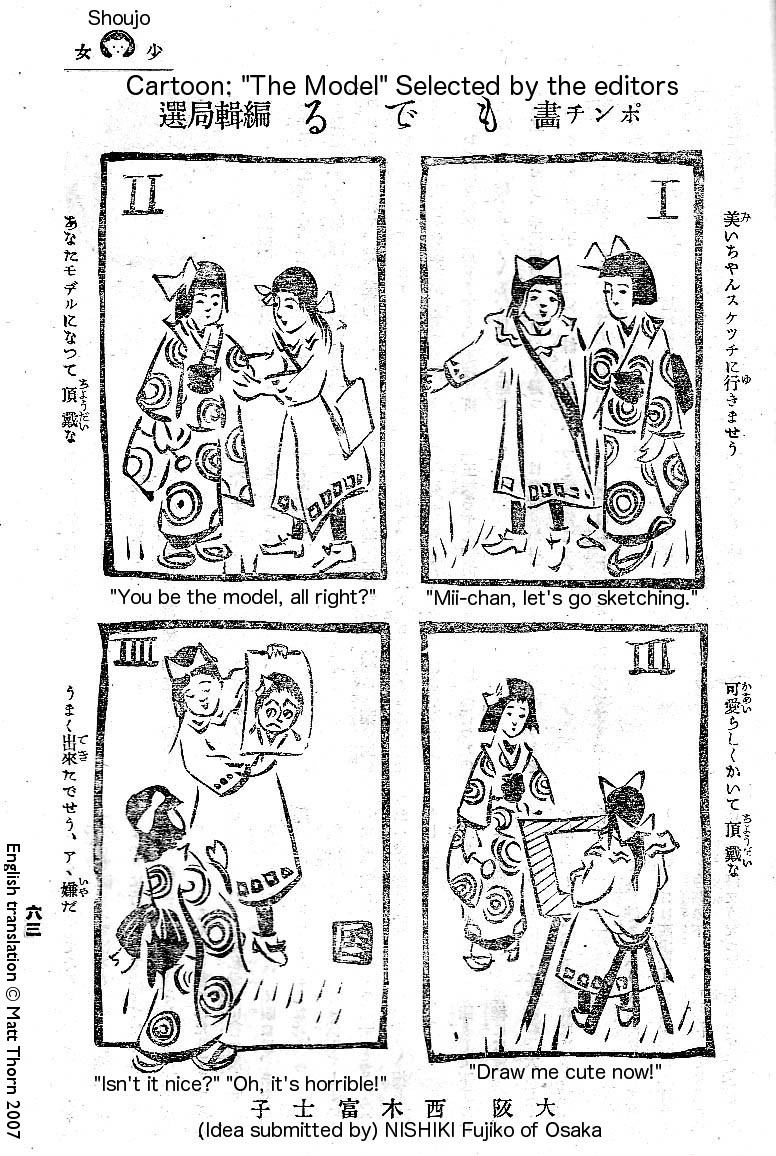
A henohenomoheji featuring in a manga panel in the 1910 issue of the Japanese girls' magazine Shōjo

== Composition ==
The word breaks down into seven hiragana characters: he (へ), no (の), he (へ), no (の), mo (も), he (へ), and ji (じ). The first two he are the eyebrows, the two no are the eyes, the mo is a nose, and the last he is the mouth. The outline of the face is made by the character ji, its two short strokes (dakuten) forming the ear or cheek.

Henohenomoheji is often used to symbolize an undistinguished or generic human face, such as the faces of kakashi (scarecrows) and teru teru bōzu. The characters are often sung as they are drawn, making the henohenomoheji an ekaki uta (絵描き歌, drawing song). There is a similar typographical face known as tsurunihamarumarumushi (つるニハ◯◯ムし), but it is not as popular as the henohenomoheji.

== Gallery ==
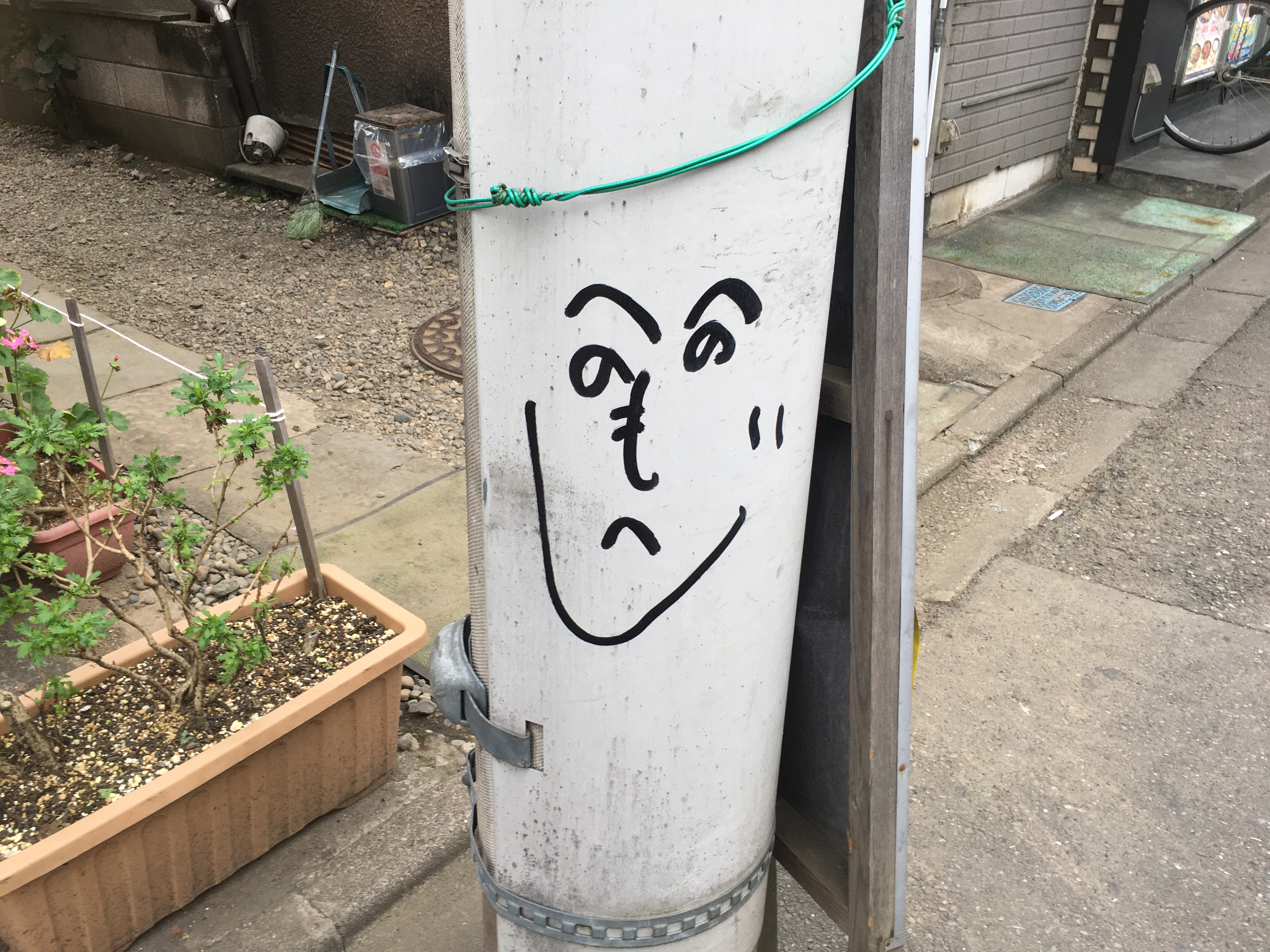
As a graffito

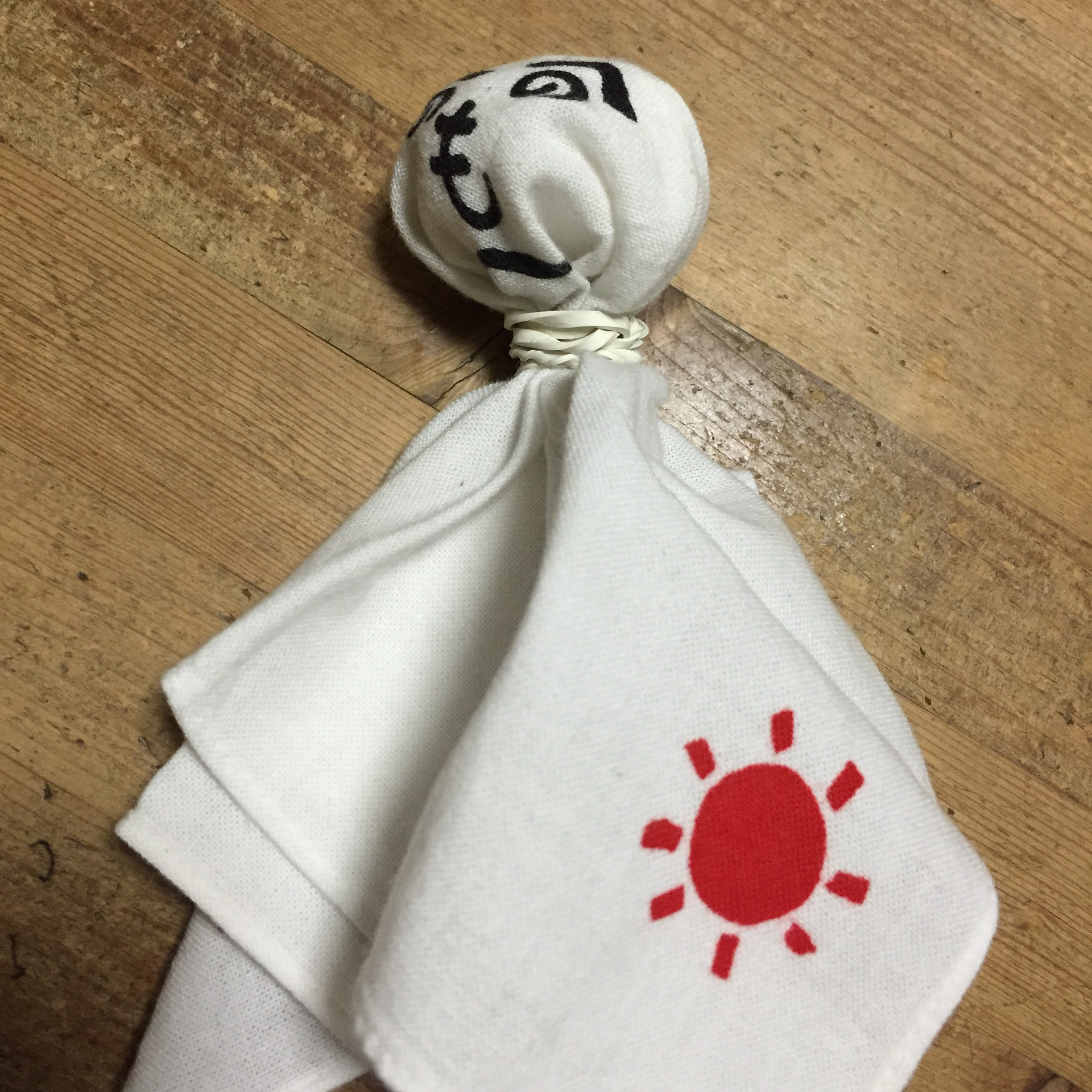
On a teru teru bōzu

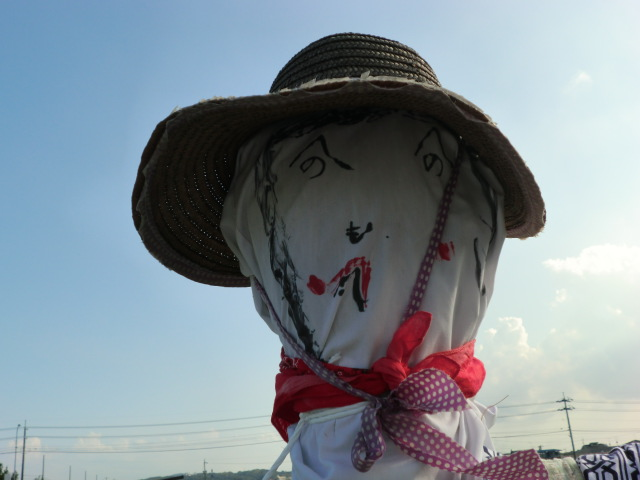
On a scarecrow

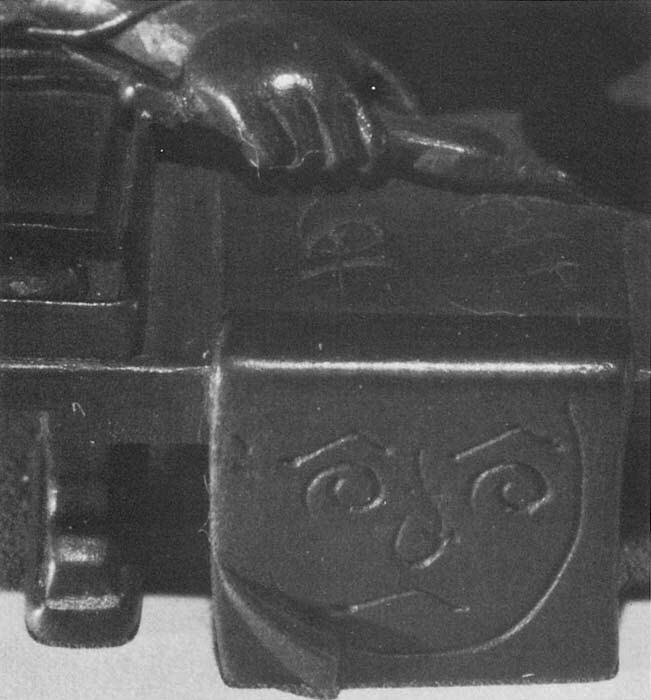
An early example as a detail on a netsuke from the 19th century

== See also ==
- ASCII art – Computer art form using text characters
- Cool S – Graffiti symbol
- Emoticon – Pictorial representation of a facial expression
- Kilroy was here – Common marking and a meme from World War II
- Smiley – Stylized image of a smiling face
- Tête à Toto – French design and children's game
