= 'A' of Charlemagne =

Relic gifted by Charlemagne

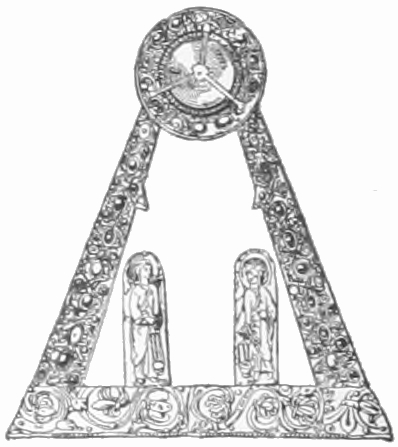
'A' of Charlemagne (Nouveau Larousse illustré, 1898)

The 'A' of Charlemagne is a relic purportedly gifted to the Abbey Church of Sainte-Foy by the emperor Charlemagne himself. It is a gold and silver open triangle with ornate jewels on the arms. The base is stronger and serves more of a structural purpose rather than an aesthetic purpose. The piece served a greater purpose over time as the attraction to the church became more focused on visiting the relic that Charlemagne presented to the church rather than its original function of honoring Saint Faith. The church itself was a common destination of medieval pilgrimage, and the change in purpose for these pilgrimages became highly focused on visiting this relic and attracted a different audience than before.

== Structure ==
The 'A' of Charlemagne is an open triangle made of wood that is varnished with silver-gilt. At the peak of the triangle is a circular piece that houses a large, polished gem on the frontal side. Below the gem sit two angels made by repoussé metal working. Both angels glance upwards toward the gem, and one angel holds an object perceived to be a lamp. The rear side of the gem is molded in a similar fashion to the angels. In the early 1950s, Jean Taralon disassembled the piece for cleaning purposes and made many discoveries about the history of the work. The wood was determined to be walnut but various sections of the "A" dated to two distinctly different time periods. He determined the base and gem to be much older, and, therefore, the arms of the piece were considered replacements on which the gems were carefully replaced.

The stark contrast between the architecture of the base and the attached arms of the piece is evident. With the exception of the angels, the base serves more of a practical purpose rather than contributing to the larger purpose of the work. The arms and the gem at the apex are more ornate and display the extravagance of Charlemagne's gift, which signifies its influence. Reliquaries are intended to house physical relics, but the "A" is unique in that its symbolic importance is more tightly linked to its political and economic power.

For images of the 'A', see the external links below.

== Transforming the Abbey Church of Saint Faith ==
When the Abbey Church of Saint Faith declared that Charlemagne gifted to them the "A," the church also welcomed the authority of Charlemagne's name. A small church was legitimized by one proclamation in the beginning, but once Charlemagne was at the pinnacle of his power, the entire purpose of pilgrimages to the church changed. The relic became independent of Saint Faith and what the church was supposed to represent. Charlemagne's influence single-handedly accomplished this, and he was rewarded with a mutualistic relationship between himself and the church. The church honors this attachment, by placing him at the right hand of the Christ in its Last Judgement sculpture above the entrance.

The legend of how the "A" ended up at the Abbey Church of Saint Faith says that Charlemagne actually founded twenty-three churches, each of which were given a letter in the order by which they were founded. By this legend, the Abbey Church of Saint Faith was given the "A" and thus was the first church to be founded, but there is no way to be sure because not all of the twenty-three churches received letters. Another reason to question this theory of assigning prestige by a stunning, gold relic is that whether it appears to be an "A" is in the eye of the beholder because there is no crossbar of the "A." This calls for interpretation as to why the church touts this specific relic. The answer lies in what a relic of this importance would physically produce for the church. Medieval pilgrimages were important to the success of the church because pilgrims were often expected to make offerings to the saints at their respective churches. By having a relic that pilgrims desired to see, they are able to attract a new, larger audience.

== Pilgrimages to the "A" ==
Pilgrimages in the medieval time period had an unspoken mutual agreement between the pilgrims and the churches or abbeys to which they visited. Pilgrims were expected to make offerings to the respective patron of each church or abbey, and in return, they received the benefits of spiritual guidance and miracles, as well as some type of physical safety. The "A" and many other reliquaries became sources of income for the churches. Although the money was ultimately used for practical up-keep and caring for the needs of pilgrims, it became important for the reliquaries to be upheld in the highest regard in order to keep a steady income flow. The prominence generated by the "A" heightened the major conflict between The Abbey Church at Conques and the nearby church, Figeac. They were known to be in constant conflict with one another and they often called to their reliquaries to lament their status upon each other. By having the "A," they could legitimize the belief that the reliquary is prestigious and impose this influence over pilgrims who would then become more likely to visit Conques, instead of Figeac.
