= Kilroy was here =

Common marking and a meme from World War II

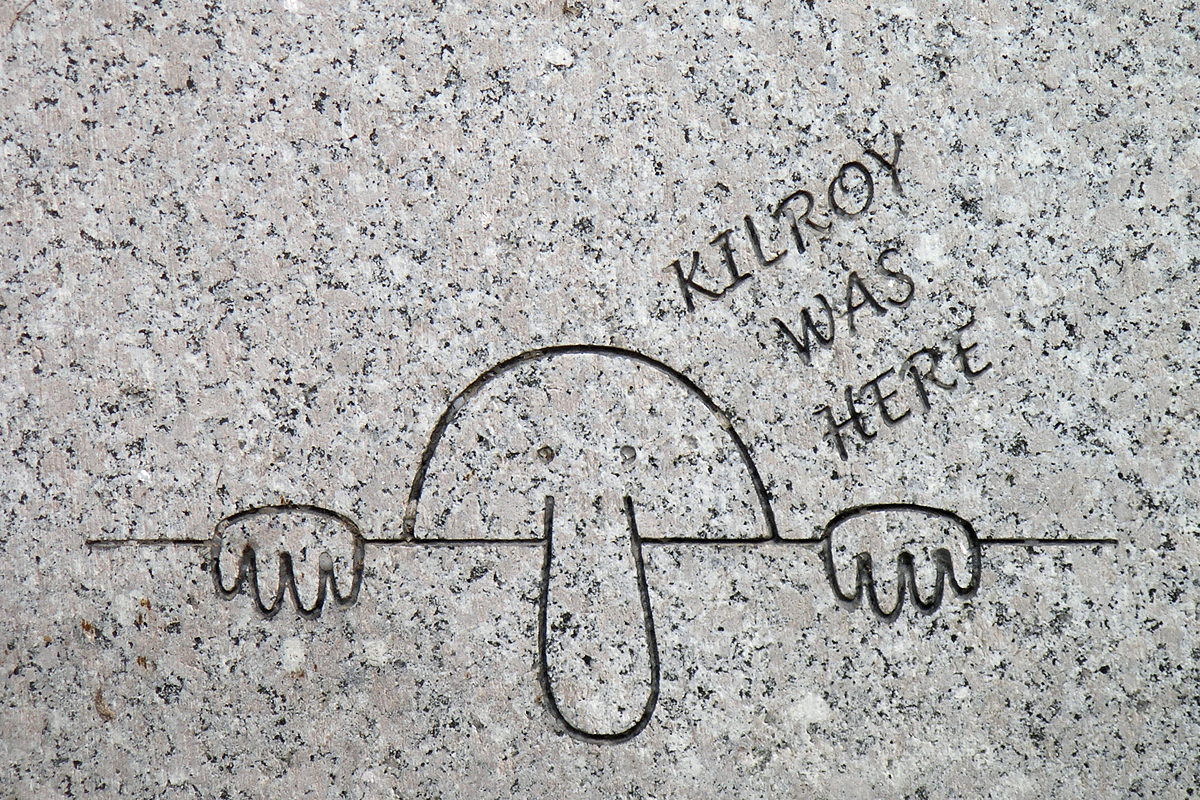
- Engraving of Kilroy on the National World War II Memorial in Washington, D.C.
- Type: Meme
- Writing: Latin script
- Created: CCC Blueprints (prior to WWII)
- Culture: United States Army culture

The opening scene "Kilroy was here" graffiti at Bikini Atoll, atomic bomb test film in 1946

Kilroy was here and Mr Chad are graffiti doodles that became popular with servicemen during World War II.

The simple doodle of a man peeking up from behind a wall—with his nose prominently hanging over it—was accompanied by the phrase "Kilroy was here" in the United States armed forces. In British military culture, Mr Chad would be seen with text in the form of "Wot, no petrol?", bemoaning the absence of some item or commodity, often due to rationing.

The origin of each is uncertain, but both phrases have been documented prior to their combination with the character doodle. Mr Chad's catchphrase is first documented in an American jewellery advertisement in 1932 as "Wot?--No Pictures?", suggesting the phrase may have been well-known by that time. Meanwhile, "Kilroy was here" wasn't documented until World War II, appearing first on ships and docks, but later scrawled by troops leaving the graffito behind as they left an area.

The character of "Mr Chad"—or just "Chad"—may have been derived from a British cartoonist in 1938. According to Dave Wilton, "Some time during the war, Chad and Kilroy met, and in the spirit of Allied unity merged, with the British drawing appearing over the American phrase." Other names for the character include Smoe, Clem, Flywheel, Private Snoops, Overby, Eugene the Jeep, Scabooch, Foo, and Sapo.

According to Charles Panati, "The outrageousness of the graffiti was not so much what it said, but where it turned up." It is not known if there was an actual person named Kilroy who inspired the graffiti, although there have been claims over the years.

In the 20th century, Kilroy became noted as an early example of a meme.

== Origin and use of "Kilroy was here" ==
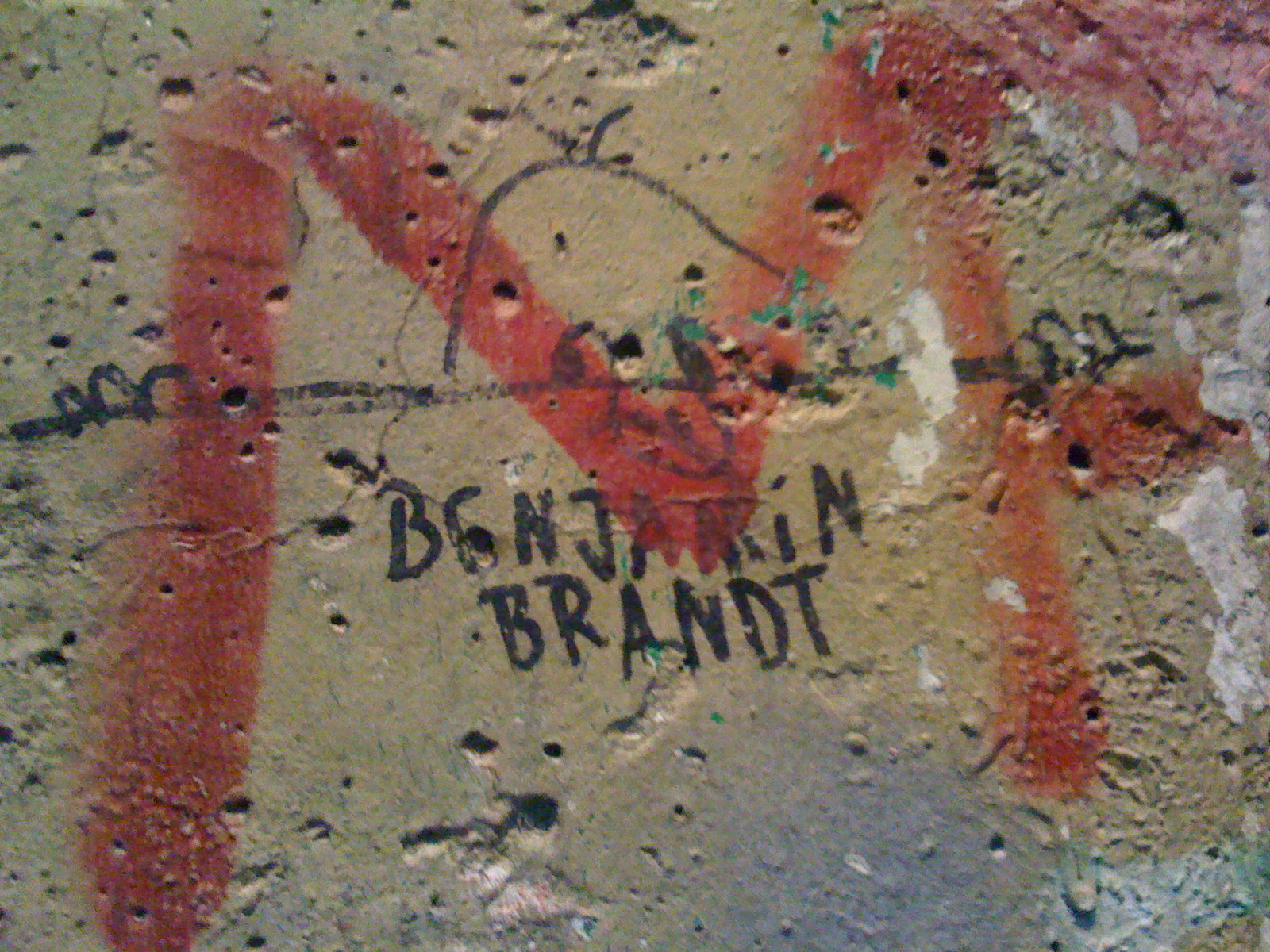
A depiction of Kilroy on a piece of the Berlin Wall in the Newseum in Washington, D.C.

The phrase may have originated through United States servicemen who would draw the picture and the text "Kilroy was here" on the walls and other places where they were stationed, encamped, or visited.

An ad in Life magazine noted that WWII-era servicemen were fond of claiming that "whatever beach-head they stormed, they always found notices chalked up ahead of them, that 'Kilroy was here'". Brewer's Dictionary of Phrase and Fable notes that it was particularly associated with the Air Transport Command, at least when observed in the United Kingdom. At some point, the graffiti (Chad) and slogan (Kilroy was here) must have merged.

Many sources claim origin as early as 1939. Earlier examples of the phrase dating from 1937 are unverified.

According to one story, German intelligence found the phrase on captured American equipment. This led Adolf Hitler to believe that Kilroy could be the name or codename of a high-level Allied spy. At the time of the Potsdam Conference in 1945, it was rumored that Stalin found "Kilroy was here" written in the VIP bathroom, prompting him to ask his aides who Kilroy was. War photographer Robert Capa noted a use of the phrase at Bastogne during the Battle of the Bulge in December 1944: "On the black, charred walls of an abandoned barn, scrawled in white chalk, was the legend of Gen. Anthony McAuliffe's soldiers: KILROY WAS STUCK HERE."

=== Foo was here ===
Digger History, the Unofficial history of the Australian & New Zealand Armed Services, says of Foo that "He was chalked on the side of railway carriages, appeared in probably every camp that the 1st AIF World War I served in and generally made his presence felt". If this is the case, then "Foo was here" predates the American version of World War II, "Kilroy was here", by about 25 years. "Foo" was thought of as a gremlin by the Royal Australian Air Force. It has been claimed that Foo came from the acronym for Forward Observation Officer.

=== Real Kilroys ===
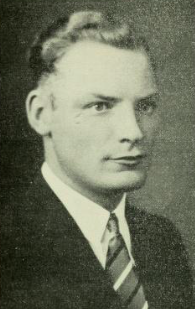
James J. Kilroy in 1933

The Oxford English Dictionary says simply that Kilroy was "the name of a mythical person".

One theory identifies James J. Kilroy (1902–1962), an American shipyard inspector, as the man behind the signature. James Kilroy had served on the Boston City Council and represented the Roxbury district in the Massachusetts Legislature during the 1930s. He worked at the Fore River Shipyard in Quincy during the war checking the work of riveters paid by how many rivets they installed. Usually, inspectors made a small chalk mark which riveters used to erase, so that they would be paid double for their work. To prevent this, Kilroy marked work he had inspected and approved with the phrase "Kilroy was here" in more durable crayon.

More than 40 candidates claimed to have originated the phrase and cartoon in response to a 1946 contest conducted by the American Transit Association to establish the origin of the phenomenon. James Kilroy was credited after his claim was verified by shipyard officials and the riveters whose work he inspected. While Kilroy's marks might normally have been painted over, interior painting was a low priority in the rush to launch ships, so Kilroy's marks were seen by thousands of servicemen who sailed aboard troopships built at Quincy. A New York Times article noted that Kilroy had marked the ships as they were being built as a way to be sure that he had inspected a compartment, and the phrase would be found chalked in places that nobody could have reached for graffiti, such as inside sealed hull spaces. Brewer's Dictionary of Phrase and Fable notes this as a possible origin, but suggests that "the phrase grew by accident."

The Lowell Sun reported in November 1945 that Sgt. Francis J. Kilroy Jr. from Everett, Massachusetts, wrote "Kilroy will be here next week" on a barracks bulletin board at a Boca Raton, Florida, airbase while ill with flu, and the phrase was picked up by other airmen and quickly spread abroad. The Associated Press similarly reported Sgt. Kilroy's account of being hospitalized early in World War II, and his friend Sgt. James Maloney wrote the phrase on a bulletin board. Maloney continued to write the shortened phrase when he was shipped out a month later, according to the AP account, and other airmen soon picked it up. Francis Kilroy only wrote the phrase a couple of times.

== Chad ==
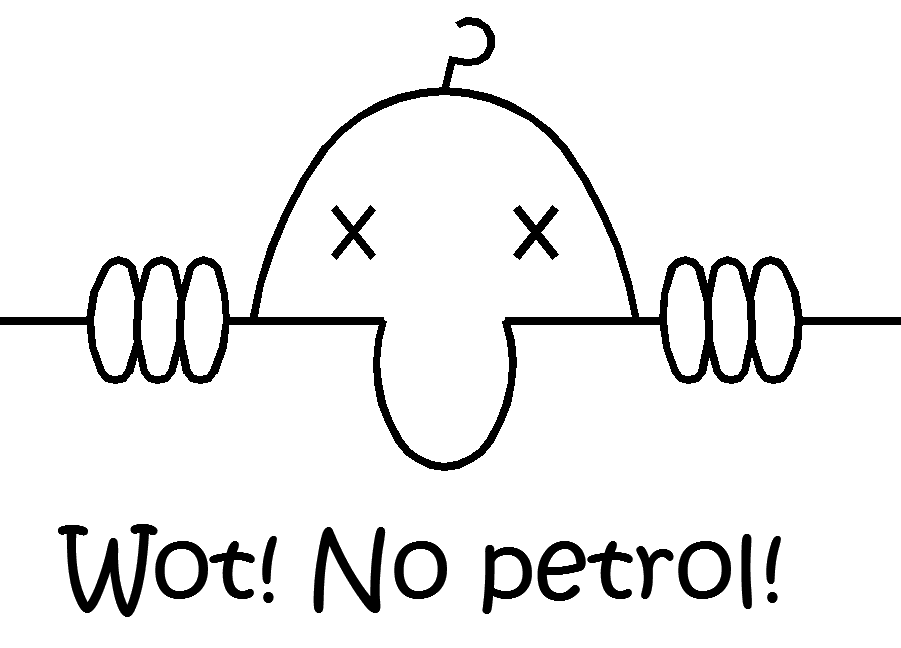
Mr Chad

The figure was initially known in the United Kingdom as "Mr Chad" and would appear with the slogan "Wot, no sugar" or a similar phrase bemoaning shortages and rationing.

He often appeared with a single curling hair that resembled a question mark and with crosses in his eyes. The phrase "Wot, no __?" pre-dates "Chad" and was widely used separately from the doodle. Chad was used by the RAF and civilians; he was known in the army as Private Snoops, and in the navy he was called The Watcher. Chad might have first been drawn by British cartoonist George Edward Chatterton in 1938. Chatterton was nicknamed "Chat", which may then have become "Chad". Life Magazine wrote in 1946 that the RAF and army were competing to claim him as their own invention, but they agreed that he had first appeared around 1944. The character resembles Alice the Goon, a character in Popeye who first appeared in 1933, and another name for Chad was "The Goon".

The Greek letter omega is one suggested origin for Chad.

Kilroy/Chad as an RLC circuit arranged to create a band-stop filter, originally drawn in Thomas Pynchon's 1963 novel V.

A spokesman for the Royal Air Force Museum London suggested in 1977 that Chad was probably an adaptation of the Greek letter omega, used as the symbol for electrical resistance; his creator was probably an electrician in a ground crew. Life suggested that Chad originated with REME, and noted that a symbol for alternating current resembles Chad (a sine wave through a straight line), that the plus and minus signs in his eyes represent polarity, and that his fingers are symbols of electrical resistors. The character is usually drawn in Australia with pluses and minuses as eyes and the nose and eyes resemble a distorted sine wave.

The Guardian suggested in 2000 that "Mr. Chad" was based on a diagram representing an electrical circuit. One correspondent said that a man named Dickie Lyle was at RAF Yatesbury in 1941, and he drew a version of the diagram as a face when the instructor had left the room and wrote "Wot, no leave?" beneath it.

This idea was repeated in a submission to the BBC in 2005 which included a story of a 1941 radar lecturer in Gainsborough, Lincolnshire, who drew the circuit diagram with the words "WOT! No electrons?" The RAF Cranwell Apprentices Association says that the image came from a diagram of how to approximate a square wave using sine waves, also at RAF Yatesbury and with an instructor named Chadwick. This version was initially called Domie or Doomie, and Life noted that Doomie was used by the RAF. REME claimed that the name came from their training school, nicknamed "Chad's Temple"; the RAF claimed that it arose from Chadwick House at a Lancashire radio school; and the Desert Rats claimed that it came from an officer in El Alamein.

It is unclear how Chad gained widespread popularity or became conflated with Kilroy. It was, however, widely in use by the late part of the war and in the immediate post-war years, with slogans ranging from the simple "What, no bread?" or "Wot, no char?" to the plaintive; one sighting was on the side of a British 1st Airborne Division glider in Operation Market Garden with the complaint "Wot, no engines?" The Los Angeles Times reported in 1946 that Chad was "the No. 1 doodle", noting his appearance on a wall in the Houses of Parliament after the 1945 Labour election victory, with "Wot, no Tories?" Trains in Austria in 1946 featured Mr. Chad along with the phrase "Wot—no Fuehrer?"

As rationing became less common, so did the joke. The cartoon is occasionally seen today as "Kilroy was here", but "Chad" and his complaints have long fallen from popular use, although they continue to be seen occasionally on walls and in references in popular culture.

== Smoe ==
Writing about the Kilroy phenomenon in 1946, The Milwaukee Journal describes the doodle as the European counterpart to "Kilroy was here", under the name Smoe. It also says that Smoe was called Clem in the African theater. It noted that next to "Kilroy was here" was often added "And so was Smoe". While Kilroy enjoyed a resurgence of interest after the war due to radio shows and comic writers, the name Smoe had already disappeared by the end of 1946.

A B-24 airman writing in 1998 also noted the distinction between the character of Smoe and Kilroy (who he says was never pictured), and suggested that Smoe stood for "Sad men of Europe". Correspondents to Life magazine in 1962 also insisted that Clem, Mr. Chad or Luke the Spook was the name of the figure, and that Kilroy was unpictured. The editor suggested that the names were all synonymous early in the war, then later separated into separate characters.

== Other names ==
Similar drawings appear in many countries, including "Herbie" or "Clem" in Canada, and "Overby" in Los Angeles in the late 1960s. In Poland, the character is known as "Józef Tkaczuk" or "M. Pulina", and in Russia, the phrase "Vasya was here" (Russian: Здесь был Вася) is a notorious piece of graffiti. In Chile, the graphic is known as a "sapo" (slang for nosy).

Other names for the drawing include "Flywheel", "Private Snoops" and "The Jeep". An advertisement in Billboard in November 1946 for plastic "Kilroys" also used the names "Clem", "Heffinger", "Luke the Spook", "Smoe", and "Stinkie". Luke the Spook was the name of a B-29 bomber, and its nose-art resembles the doodle and is said to have been created at the Boeing factory in Seattle.

== In popular culture ==
Peter Viereck wrote in 1948 that "God is like Kilroy. He, too, Sees it all."

In the 1948 Bugs Bunny short Haredevil Hare, Bugs, upon arriving on the surface of the moon, declares that he's the first living thing to ever land there. As he says this, he passes a rock with "Kilroy was here" written on it.

Kilroy is seen scrawling "Kilroy is here" on a wall in Tennessee Williams's 1953 play Camino Real, which he revises to "was" before his final departure. Kilroy functions in the play as "a folk character ... who here is a sort of Everyman." The graffiti appears on the cover of the first edition published by New Directions. Isaac Asimov's short story "The Message" (1955) depicts a time-travelling George Kilroy from the 30th century as the writer of the graffiti.

Thomas Pynchon's novel V. (1963) includes the proposal that the Kilroy doodle originated from a band-pass filter diagram.

The Move recorded a song called "Kilroy Was Here", written by Roy Wood, on their 1968 album Move. The lyrics specifically refer to the graffiti: "Kilroy was here / Left his name around the place / Kilroy was here / But I've never seen his face." In his 2024 book on Wood, James R. Turner writes that the song's narrator "speculates about [Kilroy's] identity using wonderful rhyming couplets, as well as commentating that Kilroy seems to get around a lot."

Ken Young wrote a parody of 'Twas the Night Before Christmas which was transmitted to Apollo 8 on 25 December 1968. It featured the lines "When what to his wondering eyes should appear, but a Burma-Shave sign saying, 'Kilroy was here'."

In the 1975 M*A*S*H episode The Bus, Hawkeye Pierce (Alan Alda) writes "Kilroy" in a dust-encrusted bus window as B.J. Hunnicutt (Mike Farrell) peers out from behind the window, his hands and nose resting on its top edge.

In 1983, rock band Styx released their eleventh studio album, Kilroy Was Here. The album functions as a light rock opera. It tells the story of Robert Kilroy, a rock and roll performer who was placed in a futuristic prison for "rock and roll misfits" by the anti-rock-and-roll group the Majority for Musical Morality (MMM) and its founder Dr. Everett Righteous. When Jonathan Chance (played by guitarist Tommy Shaw) finally meets Kilroy at the very end of the song Mr. Roboto, Kilroy unmasks and yells, "I'm Kilroy! Kilroy!" ending the song.

Kilroy was also featured on New Zealand stamp #1422 issued on 19 March 1997.

In the opening credits of the 2009 American sitcom Community, two Kilroys are drawn in blue ink on the inside of a paper fortune teller, their noses forming the L's of lead actor Joel McHale's name.

The 2022 horror film Killroy Was Here, directed by Kevin Smith, reimagined the character as Killroy [sic], a monster who is, according to Smith, "...A combination of Golem, the Boogeyman, and the Grim Reaper."

== Gallery ==
Israeli soldier sleeping during the 1948 Arab–Israeli War, Chad is seen on the wall together with inscription "Wot? No Arabs", November 1948.

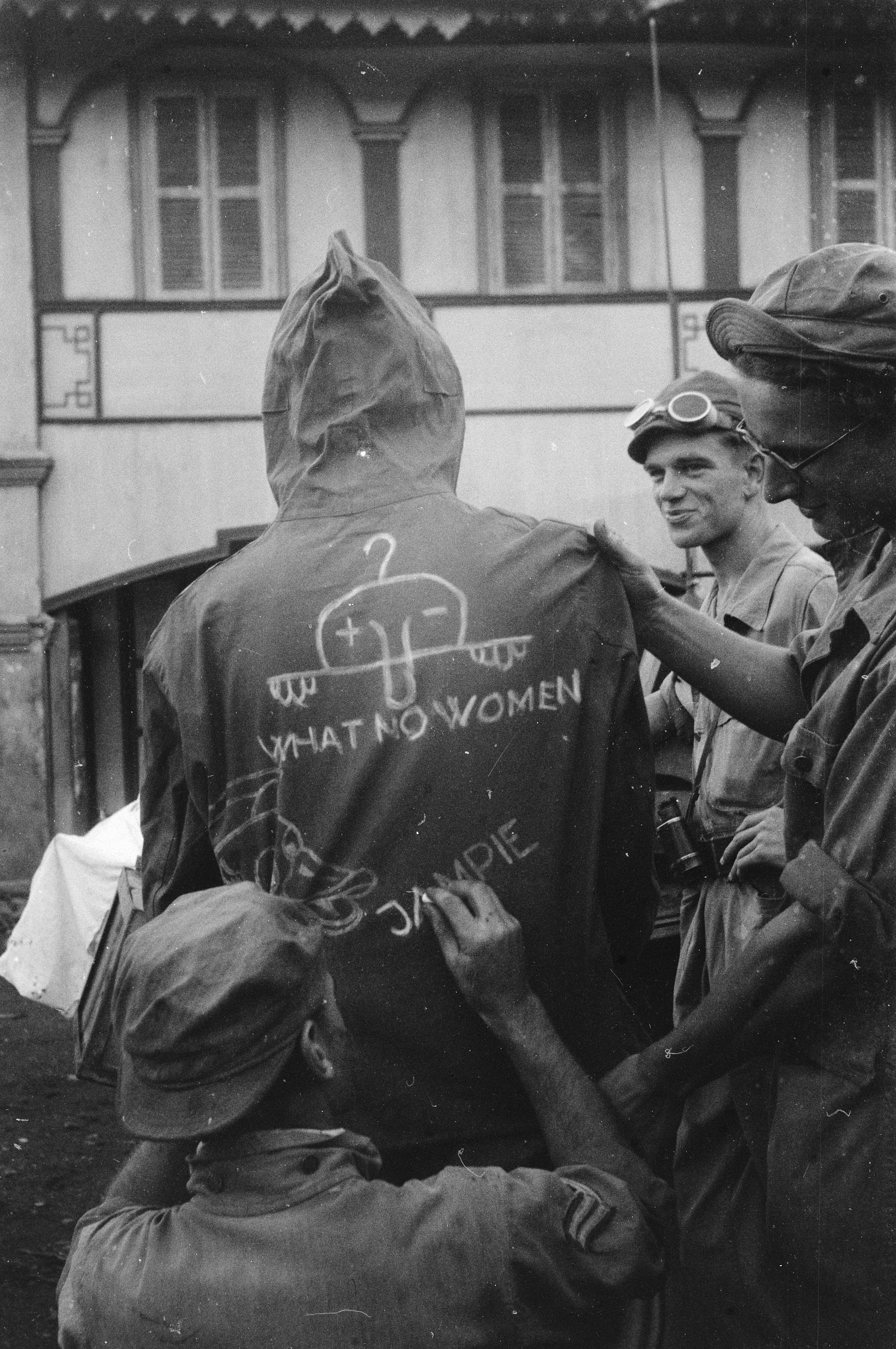
Comrades had drawn Chad together with the statement "What no women", the head of Donald Duck and the word "Jampie" on the back of a rain jacket of a Dutch soldier, 1948.

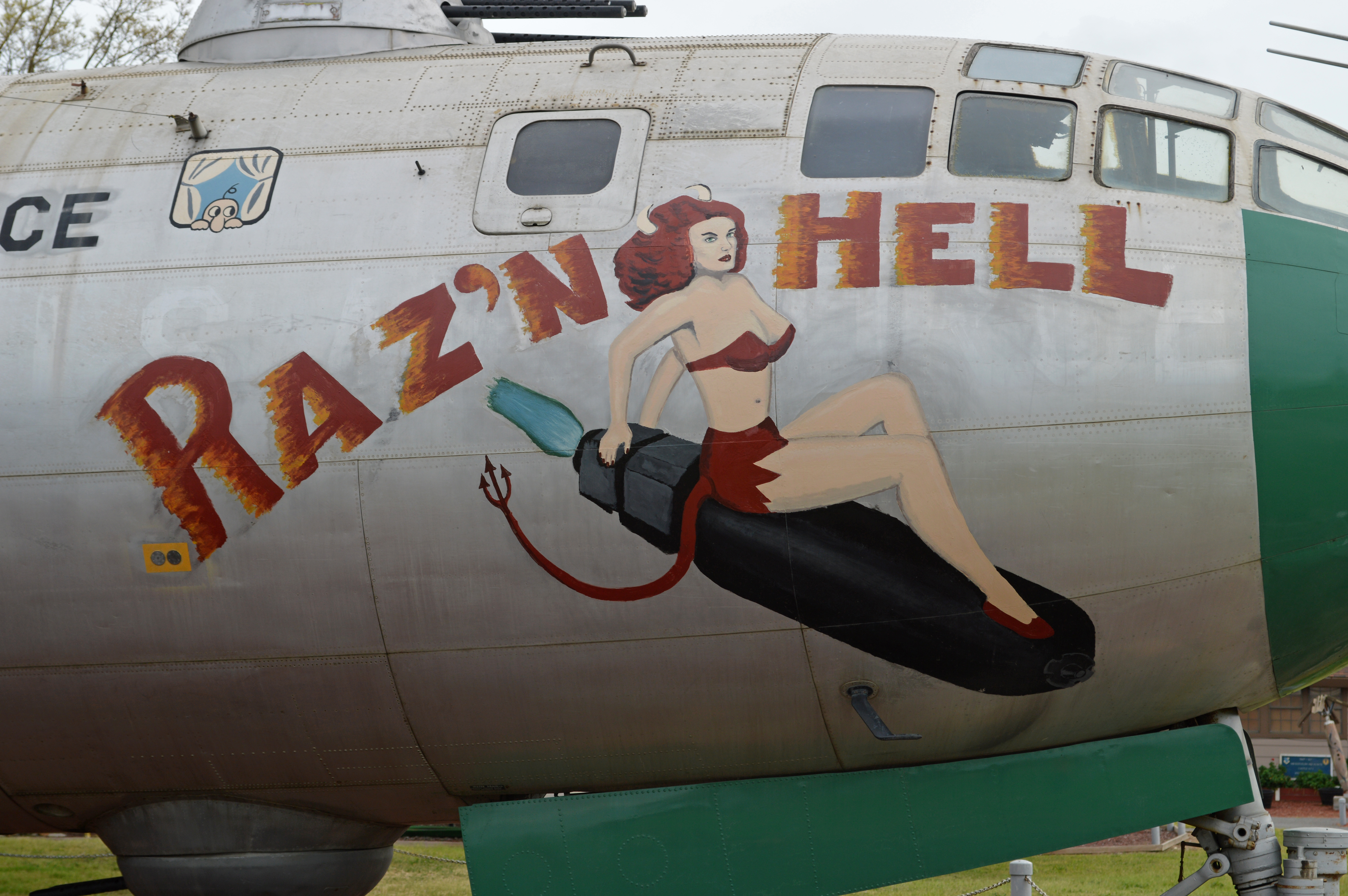
Nose art on B-29A Superfortress "Raz'n Hell", Kilroy is seen in the top left corner.

== See also ==
- Alfred E. Neuman, MAD Magazine mascot with the catch phrase "What, me worry?"
- Henohenomoheji – Face drawn using hiragana characters
- Józef Tkaczuk, a similar Polish graffiti phenomenon
- Tête à Toto – French design and children's game
