= Tête à Toto =

French design and children's game

Example of Toto (as he appears in the school game)

The tête à Toto is a French typographical design and children's game, well known to French schoolchildren. It consists of the equation "0+0=0", written with the first two "0"s for eyes, the "+" for a nose, the "=" for a mouth, and the final "0" surrounding, as a stylized face or skull.

It is drawn while reciting:

Zéro plus zéro égale
la tête à Toto

Translation:

Zero plus zero equals
Toto's head

As his head equals zero, it means that his intelligence is nil.

The name, or character, of Toto is a common stock character in French culture; he is the generic child used in jokes ("Toto asks his mother..."). See Blague de Toto (Toto joke).

== Other uses ==
- A circumlocution for "zero"
- In prostitution, slang for a prostitute – or rather, prospective prostitute – who has not had a single client (i.e., who has had zero clients).

== See also ==
- Henohenomoheji, similar typographical face in Japanese
