= Interpersonal adaptation theory =

Interpersonal (or interaction) adaptation theory (IAT) is often referred to as a theory of theories. Several theories have been developed to provide frameworks as explanations of social interactions. After reviewing and examining various communication theories and previous empirical evidence pertaining to interpersonal communication, a need to address ways in which individuals adapt to one another in interactions became apparent. The importance of observing both sides of a dyadic interaction lead to the development of the interpersonal adaptation theory. The theory states, individuals enter interactions with expectations, requirements, and desires, which combined establish an interaction position. Once the interaction begins, the difference between interaction position and the other party's actual behavior determines whether the individual will adapt and continue the communication positively or not.

== Background ==
In 1995, Judee K. Burgoon, Lesa Stern, and Leesa Dillman published a book titled, Interpersonal Adaptation: Dyadic Interaction Patterns in which they described their findings on a "new" theory which drew from the results of previous theories. Burgoon and her team examined fifteen previous models and considered the most important conclusions from the previous empirical research. They reviewed theories based in biological, arousal and affect, approach and avoidance, compensation and reciprocity, communication and cognitive, and social norms models. The conclusion after consideration of a multitude of theories and models stated, "while most theories predict a mix of patterns rather than committing to a single dominant pattern, they conflict over which patterns are likely under a given set of conditions."

The theories and the models from which they are derived include:

- Biologically based models: interacting individuals will exhibit similar behaviors to one another. Patterns presumed to be innate based on basic needs in bonding, safety, and social organization
  - Motor mimicry – describes an interaction and how an interactant will mimic another, usually out of empathy, or perceived empathy
  - Interactional synchrony
  - Mirroring
- Arousal-based and affect-based models: internal and emotional states are driving forces in people's decisions to approach or avoid others
  - Affiliative conflict theory (ACT) – Argyle and Dean (1965) – individuals have needs for both affiliation and autonomy
  - Discrepancy arousal theory (DAT) – Cappella and Green (1982) – predicts discrepancies from expected behavior patterns produce arousal change
- Approach and avoidance models: reciprocity and compensation
  - Arousal-labeling theory – Patterson (1976) – external factors influence how an individual will react in any given interaction
- Social-norm models: out of felt social obligation, individuals will reciprocate the behaviors they receive from others
  - Norm of reciprocity – out of social obligation, an individual will respond in the same manner as another
  - Communication accommodation theory (CAT) – Gallois et al. (1991) and Giles (1973) – considers the way an individual interacts with another based on the context of the interaction
  - Social exchange theory
  - Resource exchange theory
- Communication and cognitive based models: communication-related cognitions and behaviors, analyzing the interaction patterns and the meaning behavioral patterns convey
  - Sequential functional model – explains the stability of interaction and how each interactant accommodates the other
- Combined elements of preceding models:
  - Expectancy violations theory (EVT) – Burgoon (1978) – an interaction can be described positively or negatively based on an individual's expectations and the actual behavior of the other person
  - Cognitive valence theory (CVT) – Andersen (1985) – describes and explains the process of intimacy exchange within a dyad relationship

These previous theories combined with empirical evidence resulting from Burgoon's and her colleagues' own studies, birthed the interpersonal adaptation theory.

== Definitions ==
- Requirements – interactant's basic human needs and drives; i.e. survival, safety, comfort, autonomy, affiliation
- Expectations – what is anticipated based on social norms, social prescriptions, individuated knowledge of the other's behavior; i.e. self-presentation, and demands
- Desires – highly personalized, one's goals, likes, and dislikes
- Interaction position – a net assessment of what is needed, anticipated, and preferred as the dyadic interaction pattern in a situation
- Actual behavior – partner's actual performed communicative behavior in an interaction
- Convergence – the act of becoming more alike as a relationship progresses. If one interactant identifies and wants to be integrated with another, the first interactant will converge toward the communication behaviors of the other, adapting to rate of speech, volume, pauses, utterances, vocabulary, posture, and/or mode of dress.
- Divergence – the opposite of convergence; becoming more dissimilar. Divergence occurs when interactants try to accentuate communicative differences between themselves and another interactant
- Mirroring – an individual's behavior becomes identical to the other party's behavior; also referred to at matching
- Compensation – an individual reacting dissimilar to another individual's response
- Reciprocity – an individual will react in a similar way to another individual's reaction
- Maintenance – an individual's communicative behaviors and patterns attempt to maintain stability throughout an interaction

== Basics ==
As previously stated, individuals enter interactions with a combination of expectations, requirements, and desires. The individual's expectations refers to how they anticipate the other party will respond in the given interaction. The individual's requirements are based on their biological basic needs. Lastly, the individual's desires are driven by their personalized likes and dislikes.

For example, when a wife of an airman comes to her husband after he has hurt her emotionally, because he has not been spending enough time with her before he deploys, she may expect him to behave defensively, need him to not get mad thus spending even less time with her, and want him to understand her feelings. The wife's requirements, expectations, and desires are a combination of biological needs (unconsciously presumed or performed) and socially learned behaviors. Expectations are typically based on previously experienced social interactions or social norms. Requirements, such as the need for safety, may be more prominently based on a biological need for survival.

In the above example, according to IAT, if the husband responds in a manner which meets his wife's requirements and desires, she will reciprocate and posture to mirror his behavior in the interaction. The theory explains, the reason reciprocity occurs, is because a positive and stable interaction is most preferred.

If in the given example, the husband meets his wife's expectations and behaves unfavorably toward her, her response behavior will diverge, to deescalate the situation. The use of compensation is the most common behavioral response to occur in this interaction. In divergence, the wife may assume a role of the "fire extinguisher" and find herself frequently putting out fires or deescalating negative interactions in the relationship.

Another example of interpersonal adaptation theory may be observed in an international business exchange. Consider the following example, in the United States business meeting culture is conducted in a direct, forward, and opinionated way. American business people engaged in meetings with an agenda and openly voice their ideas and opinions. In contrast, Japanese business culture is formal, polite and conducted at an elevated level of etiquette. In events in which the two cultures engage in business together, the Japanese businessman may expect the American businessman to be direct and opinionated but prefer politeness. If instead the American displays tact and decorum, the interaction will be more positive than had the expectation of the Japanese businessman been met. In this cross-cultural exchange, the interaction will likely adapt in convergence reciprocity.

== Theory ==
The review of past theories, empirical evidence, and considerations of their own investigations, led Burgoon and her colleagues to propose nine principles meant to guide the new interaction adaption model:

1. There may be an innate pressure to adapt interaction patterns

- unconscious, inborn need to adapt interaction styles

2. At the biological level, the inherent pressures are toward entrainment and synchrony, with the exception of compensatory adjustments that ensure physical safety and comfort

- it is advantageous for survival to converge and synchronize, except in situations where divergence is essential to deescalate a situation

3. Approach or avoidance drives are not fixed or constant but cyclical due to satiation at a given pole

4. At the social level, the pressure is also toward reciprocity and matching

5. At the communication level, both reciprocity and compensation may occur

6. Despite predispositions to adapt, the degree of strategic, conscious adaptation present in any situation will be limited due to:

a) individual consistency in behavioral style
b) internal causes of adjustments
c) poor self-monitoring or monitoring of the partner
d) inability to adjust performance
e) cultural differences in communication practices and expectations

7. The combined biological, psychological, and social forces set up boundaries within which most interaction patterns will oscillate, producing largely matching, synchrony, and reciprocity

8. Many variables may be salient moderators of interaction adaptation.

9. Predictions about functional complexes of behaviors should be more useful and accurate than predictions about particular behaviors viewed in isolation of the function they serve

Based on the foundation set by the proposed nine guiding principles and the recognized importance of observing both sides of an interaction, the dyadic model of the interaction adaptation theory was created. The interaction adaptation model is derived from five key concepts.

The first three of the five concepts, which govern behavior are requirements, expectations, and desires. Individuals engaging in an interaction begin with a combination of the three.

Requirements ($R$) – based on an individual's basic human needs, or what they feel is needed at the time of an interaction. Requirement factors occur below conscious awareness.

Expectations ($E$) – based in social factors, influenced by social norms, social prescriptions, and knowledge of the typical behavior of the other interactant. Expectations are anticipated by the context of the interaction.

Desires ($D$) – highly personalized, based on personal goals, likes, and dislikes. Desires are influenced by an individual's personality, personal social experiences, and culture.

R, E, & D are interrelated and not independent.

The fourth concept, interaction position, is a product of an individual's requirements, desires, and expectations.

Interaction Position ($IP$) – a derivative behavioral predisposition

Burgoon and her colleagues presented the first four concepts in mathematical formula format:

$$R + E + D = IP$$

Understanding R, E, D and IP

- R, E, and D proscribe certain response options
- R, E, and D are hierarchically ordered – IP is typically driven by required needs first and so on
- Rs do not result in a single interaction pattern
- Es predominate in the equation and lead to strong inclination to match and reciprocate another's behavior
- Ds are less likely to be more significant than R or E but also lead to matching and reciprocation

The fifth concept is actual behavior which is used as a comparison point against the interaction position.

Actual Behavior ($A$) – partner's actual performed behavior in an interaction

Understanding IP and A

- IP and A can be placed on a continuum. The discrepancy assessed between the two determines the interaction outcome.

- Large discrepancies between IP and A should activate a) behavioral change, b) cognitive change or c) both

- The goal is to minimize the gap between IP and A and align both individual's behavior with the IP by prompting a reciprocal response from the partner

- If an interactant's IP matches a partner's A, the interactant will be inclined to match or reciprocate the partner's behavior
- If IP equals A for both parties, a stable exchange should progress – unless and until the IP changes for either party
- If A is more positively valenced than the IP (a positive situation), the inclination will be toward convergence and reciprocity
- If IP is more positively valenced than A (a negative circumstance) the inclination will be toward nonaccommodation, divergence or compensation

As an alternative explanation of the relationship between the interaction position and actual behavior, a preferred stable interaction is described as one in which IP and A are equal. IAT predicts if at any point, either interactant wants the interaction to continue to be stable and IP does not equal A, one of the interactants much change their IP. This change minimizes the discrepancy gap between IP and A. By changing their IP, the interactant hopes their partner will acknowledge the adjustment by matching the behavior, thus changing A. Burgoon et al., describes this as a "Follow the Leader" entrainment principle. This is a strategic adaptation which was introduced by Ickes et al., in 1982.

In summation, interpersonal adaptation theory explains the dyadic interaction as follows, prior to an individual entering an interaction with another individual, their interaction is predisposed with certain expectations, desires, and requirements, or an interaction position. Once the communication begins, the difference between interaction position and the other party's actual behavior determines whether the individual will adapt and continue the communication positively or not.
