= Janet Dean Fodor =

American linguist (1942–2023)

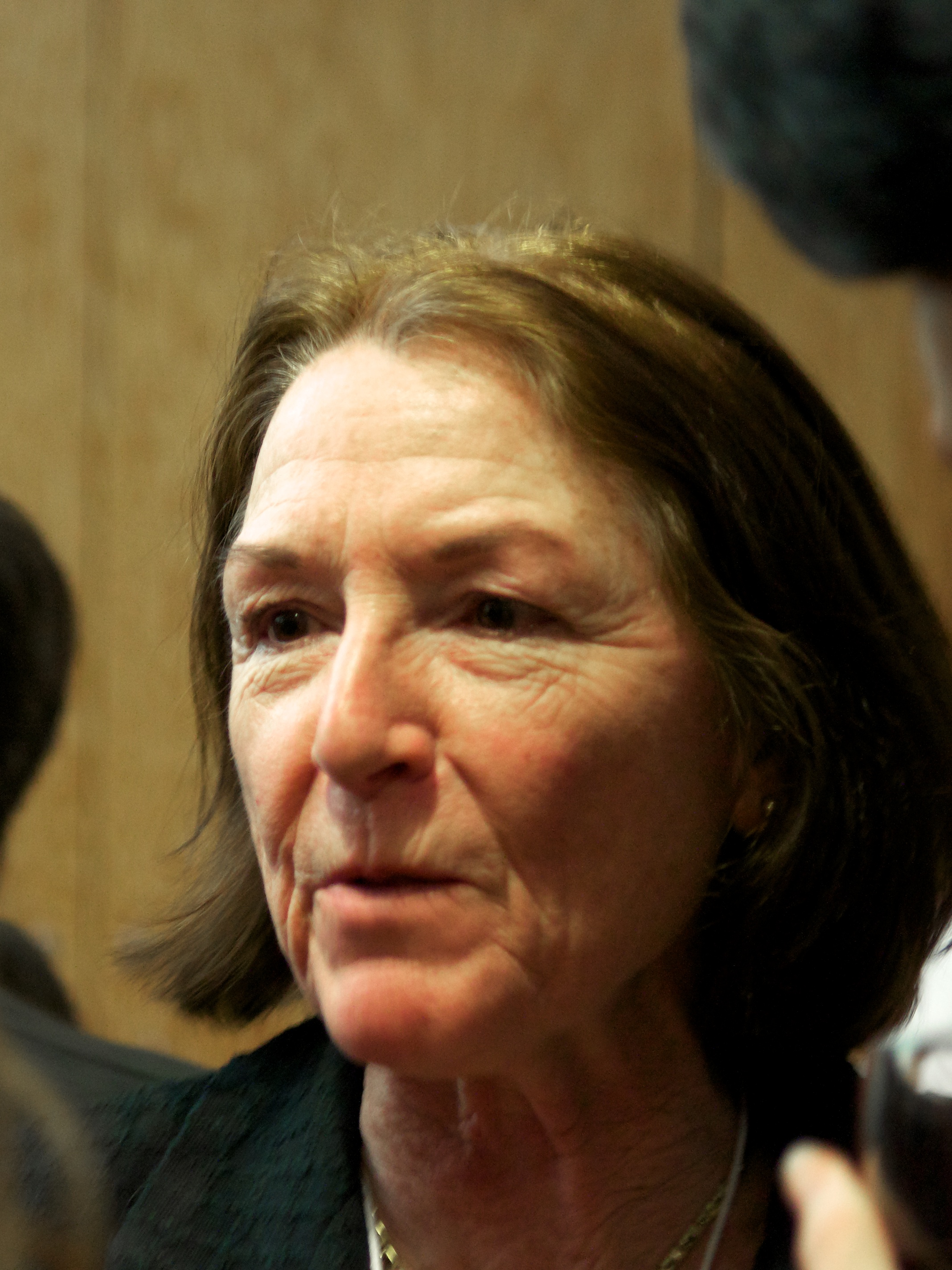
- Fodor in 2011
- Born: April 12, 1942
- Died: August 28, 2023 (aged 81)
- Education: Massachusetts Institute of Technology, Somerville College, Oxford
- Spouse: Jerry Alan Fodor (died 2017)
- Scientific career
- Fields: Psycholinguistics
- Workplaces: CUNY Graduate Center
- Doctoral advisor: Noam Chomsky, James Thomson

Janet Dean Fodor (née Dean; April 12, 1942 – August 28, 2023) was an American linguist and a distinguished professor emerita at the Graduate Center of the City University of New York. Her primary field was psycholinguistics, and her research interests included human sentence processing, prosody, learnability theory and L1 (first-language) acquisition.

== Life ==
Born Janet Dean, she grew up in England and received her B.A. in 1964 and her M.A. in 1966, both from Somerville College, Oxford. At Oxford she was a student of the social psychologist Michael Argyle, and their 'equilibrium hypothesis' for nonverbal communication became the basis for affiliative conflict theory: if participants feel the degree of intimacy suggested by a channel of nonverbal communication to be too high, they act to reduce the intimacy conveyed through other channels. She received her Ph.D. in 1970 from the Massachusetts Institute of Technology, looking at the challenge posed by opaque contexts for semantic compositionality. She came to the Graduate Center at CUNY from the University of Connecticut in 1986 as a distinguished professor of linguistics. In 1988, Fodor founded the CUNY Conference on Human Sentence Processing. Fodor supervised ca 27 dissertations of students from both City University of New York and the University of Connecticut.

She was awarded a Guggenheim Fellowship in 1992. She was President of the Linguistic Society of America in 1997 and was named a Fellow of the Linguistic Society of America in 2006. In 2014, she was elected a Corresponding Fellow of the British Academy. A volume of papers in her honor, Explicit and Implicit Prosody in Sentence Processing, was published in 2015. In 2017, she received an honorary doctorate from the Paris Diderot University.

She was married to Jerry Alan Fodor until his death in 2017.

== Summary of major publications ==
=== A New Two-Stage Parsing Model ===
Fodor and Lyn Frazier proposed a new two-stage model of parsing human sentences and the syntactic analysis of these sentences. The first step of this new model is to “assign lexical and phrasal nodes to groups of words within the lexical string that is received”. The second step is to add higher nonterminal nodes and combines these newly created phrases into a sentence. Fodor and Frazier suggest this new method because it can transcend the complexities of language by parsing only a few words at a time. Their model is based on the assumption that initial parsing occurs via the length of the phrase, not the syntactic meaning.

=== Comprehending Sentence Structure ===
Through a series of sentence analyses, Fodor found that the “WH-trace appears in mental representations of sentence structure, but NP-trace does not”. WH-trace is the placement of interrogative words (who, what, where) in a sentence. Her findings did not support those of McElree, Bever, or MacDonald, but she acknowledges that there are different types of sentences that are going to create linguistic issues that linguists don’t know how to deal with yet. Using this same data, Fodor also finds that passive verbs are more memorable than adjectives during language production.

=== Psycholinguistics Cannot Escape Prosody ===
In this article, Fodor emphasizes the importance of integrating prosody into research on sentence processing. She argues that past research has focused on syntactic and semantic analysis of sentences, but people use prosody when reading, which affects reading comprehension and sentence analysis. She also brings up the idea that people use prosody when writing, not just reading, which further affects sentence production and sentence structure. She blames technology for this new need, largely because of the newfound availability of information.

=== Empty Categories in Sentence Processing ===
Building off of the work of her doctoral advisor, Noam Chomsky, Fodor wrote an article on the importance of identifying empty categories in sentence processing. Empty categories can “account for certain regularities of sentence structure”, and attaching it with a previous word or phrase can help determine what it means. Figuring out and understanding the meaning of empty categories requires a linguistic background, but all language-speakers have the ability to use empty categories.

== Selected works ==
- Argyle, Michael & Janet Dean. 1965. Eye Contact, Distance and Affiliation. Sociometry 28, pages 289-304.
- Fodor, Janet Dean. 1970. The linguistic description of opaque contexts, PhD thesis, Massachusetts Institute of Technology. Published by Garland in 1979; republished by Routledge in 2014.
- Fodor, Janet Dean. 1977. Semantics: theories of meaning in generative grammar. Thomas Y. Crowell Co., publisher. ISBN 978-0690008661
- Fodor, Janet Dean and Fernanda Ferreira (eds.) 1998. Reanalysis in sentence processing. Springer Verlag.
