= Affiliative conflict theory =

Affiliative conflict theory (ACT) is a social psychological approach that encompasses interpersonal communication and has a background in nonverbal communication. This theory postulates that "people have competing needs or desires for intimacy and autonomy" (Burgoon, p. 30). In any relationship, people will negotiate and try to rationalize why they are acting the way they are in order (approach and avoidance) to maintain a comfortable level of intimacy.

== History ==
Affiliative conflict theory (ACT), also referred to as equilibrium theory or model, was first introduced in the 1960s by Michael Argyle. His article "Eye Contact, Distance and Affiliation", co-authored with Janet Dean was published in Sociometry in 1965, and has been used greatly as the base line for ACT. Michael Argyle had a long distinguished career in which he advanced the field of social psychology. His work on nonverbal communication greatly developed this theory and his book The Psychology of Interpersonal Behavior became an international bestseller in 1967. Argyle's curiosity regarding if social skills were learned in the same way as manual skills led him to research interpersonal behavior. Throughout his life's work he had various associates (Argyle & Dean, 1965; Argyle & Lalljee & Cook, 1968, Argyle & Ingham, 1972; Argyle & Ingham, Alkema & McCallin, 1972); all of which worked to validate the theory through their focus on the relationship between visual behavior (nonverbal behavior) and interpersonal distance (Coutts, pg. 3). Visual behavior research studies deal with influence, and with attributions made by observers. This reflects psychological research on nonverbal cues.

== Basic concept of nonverbal behavior ==
There are numerous behaviors that fall under nonverbal involvement. The nonverbal includes distance, gaze, touch, body orientation, body lean, (how much someone leans in when a conversation is going on showing how much interest they have in the person they are talking to), facial expressiveness, talking duration, interruptions, postural openness, relational gestures, head nods, and paralinguistic cues such as rate and tone, which are at least as important as the words spoken in communicating to others. One of the basic studies of nonverbal communications that was tested is the study of temporal patterning, which is defined as the relation to events in the vocal-verbal channel, when the receiver looks for cues, responds to them, and interprets them. Other times are when the same movement or configuration will be unnoticed or even disregarded. There are also beliefs that some nonverbal involvement cues have been found to increase personal performance on tasks such as test, verbal encoding, and relationship building.

Along with nonverbal behavior, another basic concept to understand is immediacy. Immediacy is generally defined as the degree of directness and intensity of interaction between two entities, such as two people. "Immediacy of body orientation is defined as the percentage of the duration of communicator-addressee interaction during which the communicator's median plane" (i.e., the plane perpendicular to the communicator's chest) passes through the addressee's position. When discussing immediacy, you tend to look at the head orientation of a communicator towards his addressee or it may be defined as the percentage of the duration of communicator-addressee interaction during which the communicator's head is directed towards the addressee's position. Duration of interaction between two individuals is defined as the length of time during which the two individuals are in each other's presence.

== Argyle and Cook's modifications ==
In 1976, Argyle and Cook modified and extended their original theory after concluding only partial support for compensation.

- In their first modification they added:
  - Form of address – emotional expression
  - Absence of physical barriers
  - Openness of posture
  - Friendliness
- The second modification addressed:
  - Effects of social norms (environment) on how people interact or obtain equilibrium levels.
  - For example, "a couple may have a mutually strong approach need, but may "constrain" their intimacy behaviors to a socially acceptable lever if they are in public."
- The third modification addressed:
  - Acknowledges that reciprocity may occur in response to intimacy changes (Burgoon 32)

== Empirical support ==
Many academic scholars have researched ACT. Joseph Cappella, Ira Firestone, and John Aiello are just a few scholars whose conclusions of ACT differed. The first scholar, Joseph Cappella, did thirty-six studies in his review that concluded that "increased proximity leads to compensatory responses on distancing, gaze, posture, body orientation, bodily activity, verbal output, etc." (Burgoon, p. 33). His results also theorize that physical closeness create a discomfort in partners that then respond by "increasing physical distance or psychological distance" (Burgoon, p. 33) The second scholar, Ira Firestone is known for his research on Reconciling verbal and nonverbal models of dyadic communications. Firestone's conclusion was opposite to Cappella's. He concluded in one of his reviews that responses to spatial adjustments had various results. "Spatial distance, posture, and visual behavior features of dyadic interaction ( an interaction between two parties) appear to show complex interdependencies. Both facilitative and inhibitory relationships abound. Clearly, the conclusion that non-verbal approach by one party induces withdrawal by the other is unwanted" (Burgoon, p. 33). The third scholar, John Aiello came to a more tempered conclusion. His studies reflected that compensation is more common in stable relationships rather than developing ones. He also stated that "comfort-oriented models do not predict observable compensation as long as variations immediacy behaviors fall with in optimal distance range" (Burgoon, p. 33). The different conclusions between these three scholars can only give a partial and inconsistent support of ACT, with proximity being the most consistent elicitor of compensation.

== Recent modifications ==
Further research has added the concepts of cognition and expectations however its "reliance on the basic assumptions and elements of Act affirms its influential impact and some of the "truths" it has uncovered" (Burgoon, pg. 38). According to Judy Burgoon the, "most significant contributions have been the introduction of arousal or discomfort as a primary indicator of behavioral changes, and attention to compensation as one major interaction pattern in interpersonal communication" (Burgoon, pg. 37).

The concept of compensation was first introduced and added to the theory by Larry Coutts and Frank Schneider in 1976 in their ACT article that investigated the intimacy equilibrium and compensation hypothesis. However, recent modifications of ACT, as seen in John Aiello and Donna Thompson's comfort model which came about in 1979, was at odds with ACT's basic premise; due to the conclusion that discomfort is not the trigger for compensation. Because "discomfort is only activated when interaction behaviors become extreme" (Burgoon, pg. 36). Another modification was done by Knowles (1980, 1989) whom introduced the rubric of field theory. One important contribution is that "behavior is goal oriented and purposeful, not necessarily mindful (Burgoon, pg. 36). The environments impact on human behavior also added another addition to ACT, known as field theory. Field Theory shows, that approach and avoidance gradients draw people together and apart. Approach is the need and desires whereas avoidance comes from enduring features like the fear of rejection. In 1989, Knowles "reconceptualization of ACT is that people feel discomfort when their internal approach and avoidance gradients are not equal" (Burgoon, pg. 36). "Knowles also allows for constant redefinition of gradients and thus a fluctuating equilibrium level" (Burgoon, pg. 37). The problems it creates for ACT is such that, if gradients fluctuate "from moment to moment" then accurate predictions appears limited" (Burgoon, pg. 37). An interesting notion to take from these modifications is that "even when we want to be intimate with another, the fear of being too intimate or being rejected (avoidance gradient) may lurk in the background as an influential factor determining behavior" (Burgoon, pg. 37).

== Equilibrium ==
The affiliative conflict theory becomes complex when one considers that approach and avoidance preferences are not the same, for example; when two people have "differing preferred levels of intimacy" (Burgoon, pg. 31). When two interactants have differing preferred levels of intimacy, they must (consciously or unconsciously) negotiate their differences to arrive at an equilibrium or homeostasis level that is mutually acceptable. This level of equilibrium is known as the intimacy equilibrium point. Equilibrium is reached when individuals or dyads can maintain sufficient distance and immediacy, such that they are close enough to meet affiliative needs, while allowing each other privacy and autonomy. ACT modification to discuss the process of compensation, is utilized to restore equilibrium. Anxiety is an example of an intimate behavior that can come from a disturbed or unbalanced equilibrium level. Thus, equilibrium can only be established when the two people/dyads are able to negotiate and maintain a comfortable level of intimacy through their nonverbal interactions.

"Because the intimacy equilibrium is said to be a product of several interrelated behaviors, it is not clear as to the influence of such variables on the overall equilibrium level. That is, while a particular factor may affect interpersonal immediacy along one behavioral dimension (e.g., eye contact) this effect may be offset by a compensatory shift in immediacy along some other (unmeasured) behavioral dimension (e.g. body orientation or interpersonal distance). As a consequence, a change may occur in one behavioral dimension, although there would be little relative change in the equilibrium as a whole" (Coutts, pg. 5.)

Affiliative Conflict Theory thus proposes that there are two separate, but related; propositions that involve maintaining the balance of the intimacy equilibrium point. The first is the "establishment of an equilibrium or balance of approach and avoidance forces reflected in the intensity of immediacy behaviors emitted by the interactants" (Coutts, pg. 3). The second deals with "compensatory changes in one or more of the immediacy behaviors following disruptions in the established equilibrium" (Coutts, pg. 3). These propositions can also be explained as balanced and unbalanced.

=== Balanced ===
A balanced equilibrium is created when there is an increase in affiliative behavior, notably a decrease in avoidance. All nonverbal behaviors contribute to maintaining balance but researchers focus mostly on three nonverbal behaviors of intimacy and their relationship, which include eye contact, physical proximity and need for affiliation.

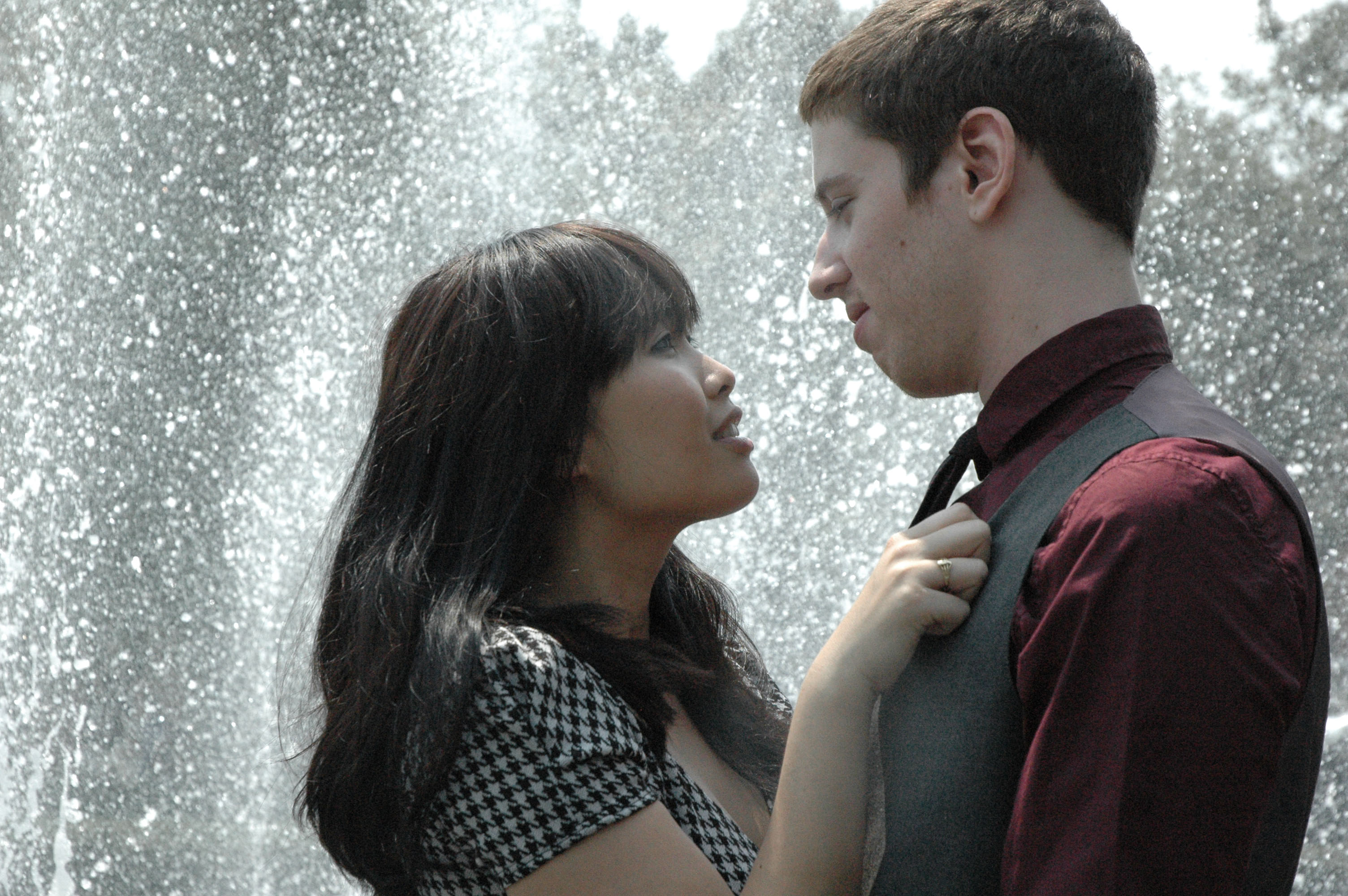
Increased eye contact and physical proximity during social interaction warrants an increase in intimacy.

- Eye-contact: Eye-contact can have a variety of subjective meanings such as friendship, sexual attraction, hate and struggle for dominance. During social interaction, people look each other in the eye, repeatedly but short periods. If we may anticipate, people look most while they are listening, and use glances of about 3–10 seconds in length. When applied to the affiliative conflict theory, the approach forces include the need for feedback and affiliative needs. Argyle suggests that increased eye contact during interaction warrants an increase in intimacy. Eye contact is a reinforcer in the operative conditioning of verbal behavior, such as looking a partner in the eye when saying "I love you" or during wedding vows.
- Physical proximity – The interpersonal distance between individuals can also affect the intimacy equilibrium level. During social interaction, one's intimacy should increase when individuals are close in space. A hug or kiss are good examples of nonverbal behaviors that increase intimacy between two interactants. In order to maintain a certain level of intimacy, a change in one's behavior, such as interpersonal distance, must be compensated for by a change in another, such as eye contact.
- Need for affiliation – The need for affiliation in terms of a balanced equilibrium, involves the desire to be associated with specific people and groups. In a nutshell, it is to have a greater sense of belonging. It plays an important role in human interactions and the formation of bonds and relationships. As a principle of this theory, the need for affiliation is determines the motivation for both verbal and nonverbal behaviors between two individuals. When a person has a moderate need of affiliation towards another person, they will tend to want to be intimate with that individual. One of the best examples is a wedding proposal. A man's desire to have a more intimate relationship with a woman is put on display and warrants a verbal response which also validates the woman's need for affiliation if she accepts his proposal.

It is supposed that similar considerations apply to other types of behavior, which are linked with affiliative motivation. Thus, there have been many studies surrounding the equilibrium point of intimacy of conversation and the amount of smiling. The more these behaviors occur, the more affiliative motivation is satisfied, but if they go too far or are decreased, anxiety is created and an avoidance behavior is shown.

=== Unbalanced ===
An unbalance is created when there is a decrease in affiliative behavior, notably this will increase avoidance, and change one or more of the immediacy behaviors following disruptions in the established equilibrium. If equilibrium for intimacy is disturbed along one of its dimensions, attempts will first be made to restore it by adjusting the others. If this is not possible because all are held constant, or because the deviation is too extreme, the subject will feel uncomfortable. If the disturbance is in the direction of less intimacy, he/she will simply feel deprived of affiliative satisfactions. Another source of unbalance is communication apprehension (CA). CA constitutes a mediating variable and is characterized as apprehension of an internal feeling of considerable discomfort which leads to communication avoidance. Thus, persons who report high levels of CA experience more anxiety during an interaction than persons who report low levels of CA. Examples of a typical unbalance in response to the close approach of another is to compensate with gaze aversion, indirect body orientation, backing away from a touch, and increased distance. A person can use avoidance behavior that expresses a desire to resist what is considered an inappropriate increase in the level of intimacy for that particular interaction.

== Gender roles ==
Research shows that gender plays an important role in ACT. As Argyle (1967) points out, females are socialized to have a higher affiliative orientation, which they may express through using more eye contact. However, other explanations can account for the higher use of mutual gaze by females. Women are also seen as being more expressive and friendlier during a conversation, while men are more somber and serious. Men are also seen to have less social interactions in comparison to their female counterparts, but when they did, they felt like they left a good representation of themselves to the person they were talking too. A higher affiliative orientation may increase the female's sensitivity and/or response to social cues. Since the eyes are the prime source of information about another's attention, females that socializes in our culture would be expected to look more at the other person's eyes for this social information, thus increasing the amount of time a female dyad engages in eye contact, and perhaps (but not necessarily) increasing the mean length of mutual gaze for the dyad. The data show that the looking time in general shows an increase in the significance of the sex effect with age. Females may rely more on external cues in general, and insofar as the eyes of another are salient cues, the percentage of time in monitoring them should increase.

Interpersonal distance was examined after a study about eye contact and mean length of mutual glance by Argyle and Ingham (1972) showed conflicting and reversal effects between males and females. In 1975, Russo conducted a study that focused on the eye-contact and distance relationship. In this study, 24 males and 24 females were drawn in same-sex pairs from kindergarten, third, and sixth grades and asked to "try out some distances and tell (the researcher) how they like them" (p. 499). Each participant sat and conversed for 2 minutes at each of the three distances. At each 2 minute interval the researcher asked the subjects how they liked talking at that particular distance. Russo found that the percentage of time engaged in contact (a) increased with distance, (b) was higher for females than males; and (c) did not significantly differ with friendship. In terms of the mean length of eye contact it: (a) did not significantly increase with interpersonal distance; (b) was higher for females than for males; and (c) was significantly greater for friends than nonfriends. Thus, the mean length of eye-contact appears to index affiliative tendencies, while the total amount of eye-contact does not.

In a research article done by the University of Hartford on "The Effects of Gender-Role Expectations Upon Perceptions of Communicative Competence", they found that during a conversation, that men and women would evaluate how the other person is feeling and "responding" to what is being said. They found that men determined that perception in a conversation "appears to be related to empathy and private self-consciousness. In other words, perceptiveness for males seems to be related to self-awareness and perspective taking. For females, perceptiveness is related to public self-consciousness, supportiveness, and warmth" (Duran, Carveth). The way that they perceive themselves is going to affect how they communicate with others. Men are more focused on the individual self while women are more focused on the social self and the environment they are in. These subconscious evaluations effect ones communication with the opposite sex.

== See also ==
- Interpersonal communication
- Intimacy
- Michael Argyle
- Social psychology
