= Immediacy =

Immediacy may refer to:

- Immediacy, a concept in English law, see duress in English law
- Immediacy, a concept in vested interest (communication theory)
- Immediacy, a condition in the Buddhist Twelve Nidānas
- Immediacy (philosophy), a philosophical concept
- Immediacy, one of the 10 principles of the Burning Man event
- Imperial immediacy, in the Holy Roman Empire, the status of persons not subject to local lords but only to the emperor
- Immediacy index, a measure of the importance of published scientific articles

== See also ==
- Immediate (disambiguation)
