= John S. Werner =

Human vision research scientist

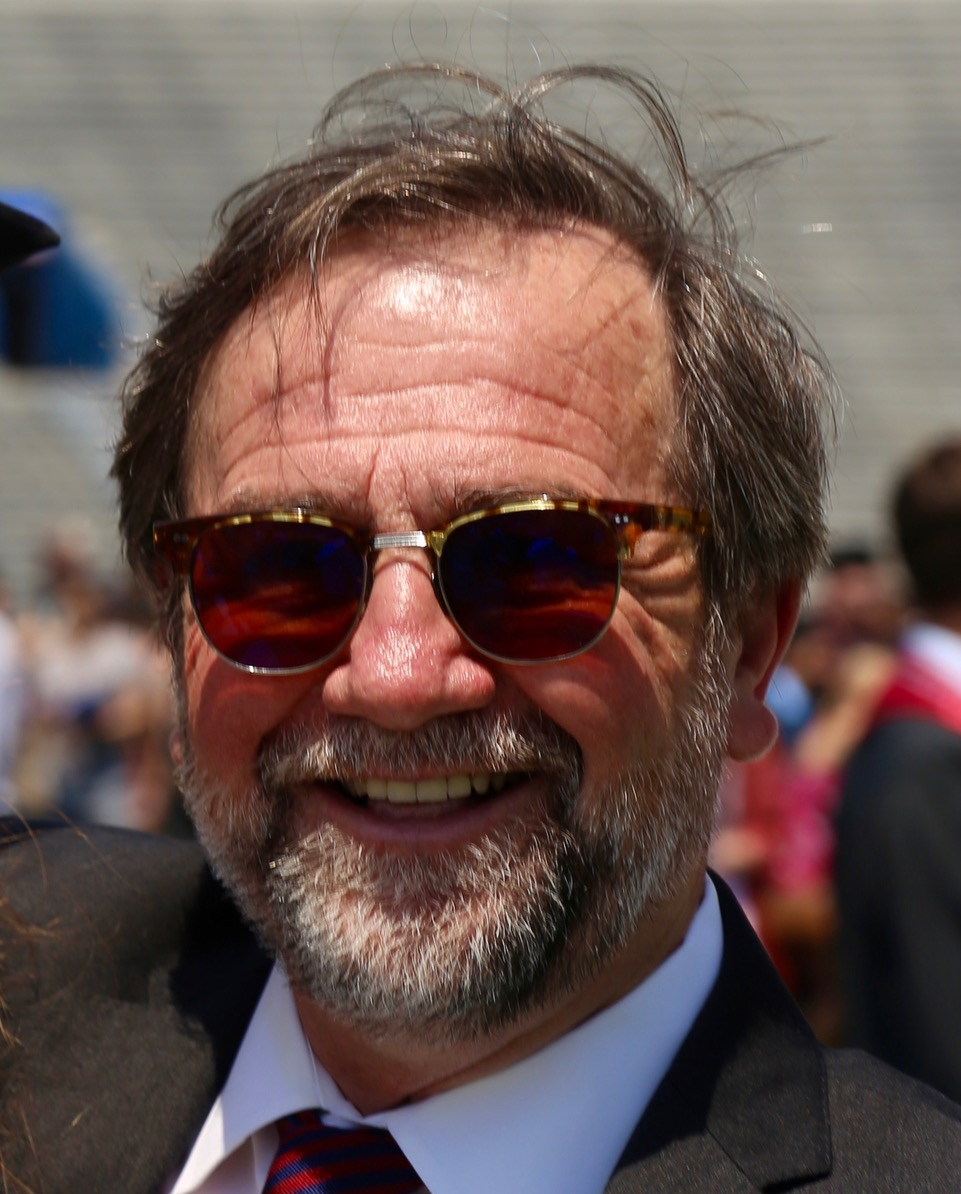
- Born: John Simon Werner; 1951 (age 74–75); Humphrey, Nebraska
- Education: University of Kansas (BA, MA) Brown University (PhD)
- Occupation: Human Vision Researcher

John S. Werner is an American scientist who studies human vision and its changes across the life span. He is a Distinguished Professor at the University of California, Davis in the Department of Ophthalmology and Vision Science, and Department of Neurobiology, Physiology and Behavior. His work has been cited more than 18,000 times.

== Education ==
John Werner graduated in 1974 from the University of Kansas with BA (with highest distinction) and MA degrees. He received his doctoral degree in 1979 from Brown University. His research was supervised by Billy Rex Wooten and Lewis P. Lipsitt. With support from a NATO-NSF fellowship, he conducted postdoctoral research in the laboratory of Jan Walraven at the Institute for Perception in Soesterberg, The Netherlands. Later, he received a DAAD fellowship to work with Lothar Spillmann in the Department of Neurology at the University of Freiburg.

== Research ==
His research is concerned with the transformations of signals, quantified psychophysically, from photoreceptors to postreceptoral processes, and color appearance. This work demonstrates changes in sensitivity of all three cone pathways from infancy to old age. His laboratory has also developed methods for imaging the living human retina in three dimensions, studies of diseases of the retina and for quantifying vasculature of the retina and choroid. He has made important discoveries that despite large changes in early stages of processing over the life span, color appearance is relatively stable, implying mechanisms of compensation, presumed to occur in cortex.

== Teaching ==
John Werner has taught a variety of courses from introductory psychology to more advanced courses for undergraduates, graduate students and medical residents. He has mentored PhD students at the University of Colorado, Boulder, and the University of California, Davis, who now hold tenured positions in Asia, Europe, and North America. Werner has been a visiting professor at the University of Freiburg, University of Potsdam, University of Regensburg and University College London.

Werner has co-edited books that are widely used in graduate courses, including Visual Perception: The Neurophysiological Foundations, Color Vision: Perspectives from Different Disciplines and The Visual Neurosciences. The latter has been translated to Mandarin.

== Awards & honors ==
- Werner is an elected fellow of the American Association for the Advancement of Science, American Psychological Association, Association for Research in Vision and Ophthalmology Gerontological Society of America, as well as the Optical Society of America. Other honors and awards include:
- American Academy of Optometry, W. Garland Clay Award (1991)
- Humboldt-Preis für Naturwissenschaftler (1994)
- University of Colorado, Ninetieth Annual Distinguished Research Lecture (1999)
- Jules and Doris Stein Research to Prevent Blindness Professorship (2000)
- NIH (NIA) MERIT Award (2001)
- Lighthouse International (New York), Pisart Award in Vision Science (2008)
- Optical Society of America, Robert M. Boynton Lecture (2013)
- University of Cambridge, Gonville and Caius College, Visiting Scholar (2014)
- International Colour Vision Society, Verriest Medal (2015)
- Colour Group of Great Britain, W.S. Stiles Memorial Lecture (2016)
- University of London, Janet and Peter Wolfe Research Lecture Award (2022)
- University of Oxford, Leverhulme Trust Visiting Professorship (Hilary and Trinity terms, 2025)
