= Immediate =

Immediate may refer to:

- Immediate Records, a British record label
- The Immediate, an Irish rock group
- Immediate Media Company, British publishing house
- Immediate Music, library music company
- Short for immediate value
- Something happening in the immediate future

== See also ==
- Immediacy (disambiguation)
