= Judee K. Burgoon =

American social scientist

Judee K. Burgoon (born 1948) is a professor of communication, family studies and human development at the University of Arizona, where she serves as director of research for the Center for the Management of Information and site director for the NSF-sponsored Center for Identification Technology Research. She is also involved with different aspects of interpersonal and nonverbal communication, deception, and new communication technologies. She is also director of human communication research for the Center for the Management of Information and site director for Center for Identification Technology Research at the university, and recently held an appointment as distinguished visiting professor with the department of communication at the University of Oklahoma, and the Center for Applied Social Research at the University of Oklahoma. Burgoon has authored or edited 13 books and monographs and has published nearly 300 articles, chapters and reviews related to nonverbal and verbal communication, deception, and computer-mediated communication. Her research has garnered over $13 million in extramural funding from the National Science Foundation, the Department of Defense, the Department of Homeland Security, the Office of the Director of National Intelligence, Counterintelligence Field Activity, and the National Institutes of Mental Health. Among the communication theories with which she is most notably linked are: interpersonal adaptation theory, expectancy violations theory, and interpersonal deception theory. A recent survey identified her as the most prolific female scholar in communication in the 20th century.

== Personal life ==
Burgoon was born as Judee Kathelene Stringer on February 5, 1948, in Ames, Iowa, to J. (Joseph) Kenneth Stringer, Jr. and Mary Elene "Polly" Stringer (maiden name Parrott). She is the oldest of five children. She has two sisters (Della and Marilyn) and two brothers (Ken (III) and Warren). She attended Grant Elementary School, J. B. Young Jr. High School, where she was inspired by her speech and choir teacher to become active in speech, drama, and debate. She also attended Central High School, where she was active in many extracurricular activities such as debate team, golf team, drama club, and organizing both the Young Republicans and Young Democrats. She spent summers working to earn money for college. She has been married twice and is divorced from her second husband Michael Burgoon, whom she wed in 1974. They have a daughter named Erin Mikaela.

== College career ==
Burgoon graduated summa cum laude from Iowa State University in 1970, where she received a bachelor's degree with a double major in Speech and English and a double minor in Social Studies and Education. A year later, she began working toward a master's degree in Speech Communication from Illinois State University, which she completed in 1972. Two years after receiving her master's degree, she received a doctorate in the joint fields of Communication and Educational Psychology from West Virginia University.

== Teaching career ==
Burgoon's teaching focuses on nonverbal communication and relational communication. Her main emphasis is in interpersonal communication processes and outcomes, expectancy violations, deception, nonverbal relational messages, conversation involvement and dominance, and dyadic adaptation patterns. She is the recipient of the International Communication Association's B. Aubrey Fisher Mentorship Award, the University of Arizona's Excellence-in-Teaching Award in Social and Behavioral Sciences, Michigan State University's Teacher-Scholar Award, and Central States Communication Association's Young Teacher Award.

== Communication theory and research ==
Burgoon's research focuses on nonverbal communication, interpersonal communication, and small group communication. She specializes in mass media and new communication and information technologies, as they relate to deception, credibility, persuasion, argumentation, and unwillingness to communicate. She once said, "A theory is nothing more than your set of systematic hunches about the way things operate. The point of trying to test theory is to see if your hunches work out." In 1999, she was awarded a Distinguished Scholar Award by the National Communication Association, its highest award for a lifetime of scholarly achievement. In 2008, Burgoon was once again awarded for her research in the field of communication with the Mark L. Knapp Award in Interpersonal Communication. Burgoon is noted as the founder or developer of such well-known communication theories as:

- Interpersonal adaptation theory
- Expectancy violations theory
- Interpersonal deception theory

The majority of these theories are outlined in her book Nonverbal Communication. Burgoon co-wrote this book with Laura K. Guerrero, Arizona State University and Kory Floyd, Arizona State University. Drawing significantly on both classic and contemporary research, Nonverbal Communication speaks to today's students with modern examples that illustrate nonverbal communication in their lived experiences. This new edition, authored by three of the foremost scholars in nonverbal communication, builds on the approach pioneered by Burgoon, Buller and Woodall which focused on both the features and the functions that comprise the nonverbal signaling system. Grounded in the latest multidisciplinary research and theory, Nonverbal Communication strives to remain very practical, providing both information and application to aid in comprehension.

=== Interpersonal adaptation theory ===
Developed in 1995 by Burgoon, Stern & Dillman, "Interaction Adaptation Theory," this theory "predicts and explains how, when, and why people adapt to another's verbal and nonverbal communication (→ Nonverbal Communication and Culture) in similar or dissimilar ways. It focuses on how pairs of communicators – actors and their partners – coordinate their communication styles with one another in ongoing conversations. The process of interaction adaptation is complex, nonobvious, and at times invisible."

=== Expectancy violations theory ===
Developed in 1978 by Burgoon, this theory has its roots in Uncertainty Reduction Theory, which attempts to predict and explain how communication is used to reduce uncertainty among people involved in conversations with one another the last time they meet. Expectancy Violations Theory however proposes that unexpected behavior causes arousal and uncertainty in people, and people then look to explain the violation in order to better predict another's behavior. This theory assumes that there is only one truth and that the theory seeks to predict the outcomes that will result when violations are presented in certain situations With this theory, Burgoon also builds upon anthropologist Edward T. Hall's previous work on proxemics and personal space. Violating someone's personal space, for example, violates the expectations of the receiving party which will "be perceived as either positively or negatively depending on the liking between the two people." Burgoon suggests that nonverbal behavior is carefully tailored to conform to the communication rules of one's partner, while violating certain social norms and individual expectations may be "a superior strategy to conformity".

=== Interpersonal deception theory ===
Developed in 1996 by Buller & Burgoon, this theory describes how "communication senders attempt to manipulate messages so as to be untruthful, which may cause them apprehension concerning their false communication being detected. Simultaneously, communication receivers try to unveil or detect the validity of that information, causing suspicion about whether or not the sender is being deceitful." This theory posits that one can detect when deception occurs from a sender's nonverbal cues. A deceitful sender tends to show signs of nervousness and a well trained nonverbal communicator can detect these signs or signals of deception.

=== Awards and honors ===
In 2006 Burgoon was honored by the International Communication Association (ICA) with the Steven H. Chaffee Career Productivity Award.

The award regularly honors a scholar, or a small group of collaborating scholar, for "sustained work on a communication research problem over an extended period." The ICA also states that "the selection committee favors research that is original, asks conceptually rich questions, and offers empirically sound evidence. The research must have comprised multiple projects and publications and generated second-generation work among students and other scholars."

Along with the prize, Burgoon was awarded $1000 at the ICA's 56th annual international conference in Dresden, Germany.

Burgoon has also been elected to the Society for Experimental Social Psychology, been named a Fellow of the International Communication Association, and has been awarded the National Communication Association's Distinguished Scholar Award for a lifetime of scholarly achievement, the Mark L. Knapp Award in Interpersonal Communication, and the Woolbert Research Award for Scholarship of Lasting Impact. In addition to her many achievements, a recent survey named her the most prolific female scholar in the field of communication of the 20th century.

In 2019, Burgoon was awarded an outstanding Illinois State University alumni and gave a speech there on the topic of deception.

== See also ==
- Communication theory
- Interpersonal communication
- Nonverbal communication

== Selected publications ==
- Burgoon, J. K., & Saine, T. J. (1978). The unspoken dialogue. Boston: Houghton-Mifflin.
- Burgoon, J. K., Buller, D. B., & Woodall, W. G. (1996). Nonverbal communication: The unspoken dialogue (2nd ed.). New York: McGraw-Hill.
- Burgoon, J. K., Guerrero, L. K., & Floyd, K. (2009). Nonverbal communication. New York: Allyn & Bacon.
- Burgoon, J. K. (1985). The relationship of verbal and nonverbal codes. In B. Dervin & M. J. Voight (Eds.), Progress in communication sciences, Vol. 6 (pp. 263–298). Norwood, NJ: Ablex Publishing.
- Burgoon, J. K., Walther, J. B., & Baesler, E. J. (1992). Interpretations and consequences of interpersonal touch. Human Communication Research, 19, 237–263.
- Walther, J. B., & Burgoon, J. K. (1992). Relational communication in computer-mediated interaction. Human Communication Research, 19, 50–88.
- Burgoon, J. K. (1993). Interpersonal expectations, expectancy violations, and emotional communication. Journal of Language and Social Psychology, 12, 30–48.
- Burgoon, J. K., Beutler, L. E., Le Poire, B. A., Engle, D., Bergan, J., Salvio, M., & Mohr, D. C. (1993). Nonverbal indices of arousal in group psychotherapy. Psychotherapy, 30, 635–645.
- Burgoon, J. K., & Dillman, L. (1995). Gender, immediacy and nonverbal communication. In P. J. Kalbfleisch & M. J. Cody (Eds.), Gender, power, and communication in human relationships (pp. 63–81). Hillsdale, NJ: Erlbaum.
- Burgoon, J. K., Johnson, M. L., & Koch, P. T. (1998). The nature and measurement of interpersonal dominance. Communication Monographs, 65, 309–335.
- Allspach, L. E., & Burgoon, J. K. (in press). Nonverbal displays. Encyclopedia of human emotions. New York: Macmillan.
- Burgoon, J. K., Berger, C. R., & Waldron, V. R. (in press). Becoming mindful in and through interpersonal communication. Journal of Social Issues.
- Burgoon, J. K., & Burgoon, M. (in press). Expectancy theories. In P. Robinson & H. Giles (Eds.), Handbook of language and social psychology (2nd ed.). Sussex, England: John Wiley & Sons.
- Burgoon, J. K., & Dunbar, N. (in press). An interactionist perspective on dominance-submission: Interpersonal dominance as an dynamically, situationally-contingent social skill. Communication Monographs.
