= Language expectancy theory =

Language expectancy theory (LET) is a theory of persuasion. The theory assumes language is a rules-based system, in which people develop expected norms as to appropriate language usage in given situations. Furthermore, unexpected linguistic usage can affect the receiver's behavior resulting from attitudes towards a persuasive message.

== Background ==
Created by Michael Burgoon, a retired professor of medicine from the University of Arizona, and Gerald R. Miller, the inspiration for LET was sparked by Brooks' work on expectations of language in 1970. Burgoon, Jones and Stewart furthered the discussion with the idea of linguistic strategies and message intensity in an essay published in 1975. The essay linked linguistic strategies, or how a message is framed, to effective persuasive outcomes. The original work for the language expectation theory was published in 1978. Titled "An empirical test of a model of resistance to persuasion", it outlined the theory through 17s.

== Expectations ==
The theory views language expectancies as enduring patterns of anticipated communication behavior which are grounded in a society's psychological and cultural norms. Such societal forces influence language and enable the identification of non-normative use; violations of linguistic, syntactic and semantic expectations will either facilitate or inhibit an audience's receptivity to persuasion. Burgoon claims applications for his theory in management, media, politics and medicine, and declares that his empirical research has shown a greater effect than expectancy violations theory, the domain of which does not extend to the spoken word.

LET argues that typical language behaviors fall within a normative "bandwidth" of expectations determined by a source's perceived credibility, the individual listener's normative expectations and a group's normative social climate, and generally supports a gender-stereotypical reaction to the use of profanity, for example.

Communication expectancies are said to derive from three factors:

1. The communicator – individual features, such as ethos or source credibility, personality, appearance, social status and gender.
2. The relationship between a receiver and a communicator, including factors such as attraction, similarity and status equality.
3. Context; i.e., privacy and formality constraints on interaction.

== Violations ==
Violating social norms can have a positive or negative effect on persuasion. Usually people use language to conform to social norms; but a person's intentional or accidental deviation from expected behavior can have either a positive or negative reaction. Language Expectancy Theory assumes that language is a rule-governed system and people develop expectations concerning the language or message strategies employed by others in persuasive attempts (Burgoon, 1995). Expectations are a function of cultural and sociological norms and preferences arising from cultural values and societal standards or ideals for competent communication.

When observed, behavior is preferred over what was expected or when a listener's initial negative evaluation causes a speaker to conform more closely to the expected behavior. The deviation can be seen as positive, but when language choice or behavior is perceived as unacceptable or inappropriate behavior, the violation is negatively received and can inhibit the receptivity to a persuasive appeal.

Positive violations occur (b) when negatively evaluated sources conform more closely than expected to cultural values or situational norms. This can result in overly positive evaluation of the source and change promoted by the actor (Burgoon, 1995).

Negative violations, resulting from language choices that lie outside socially acceptable behavior in a negative direction, produce no attitude or behavior change in receivers.

== Summary of propositions ==
Language expectancy theory is based on 17 propositions. Those propositions can be summarized as listed below:

- 1, 2 and 3: People create expectations for language. Those expectations determine whether messages will be accepted or rejected by an individual. Breaking expectations positively results in a behavior change in favor of the persuasive message while a breaking expectations negatively results in no change or an opposite behavior change.
- 4, 5 and 6: Individuals with perceived credibility (those who hold power in a society) have the freedom in persuasion to select varied language strategies (wide bandwidth). Those with low credibility and those unsure of their perceived credibility are restricted to low aggression or compliance-gaining messages to be persuasive.
- 7, 8 and 9: Irrelevant fear and anxiety tactics are better received using low-intensity and verbally unaggressive compliance-gaining. Intense and aggressive language use result in lower levels of persuasion.
- 10, 11 and 12: For the persuader, an individual who is experiencing cognitive stress will use lower intensity messages. If a communicator violates his/her norms of communication, they will experience cognitive stress.
- 13 and 14: Pretreatments forewarn receivers of the persuasive attacks (supportive, refutational or a combination). When Persuasive messages do not violate expectations created by the pretreatments, resistance to persuasion is conferred. When pretreatment expectations of persuasive messages are violated, receivers are less resistant to persuasion.
- 15, 16 and 17: Low intensity attack strategies are more effective than high intensity attack strategies when overcoming resistance to persuasion created in pretreatment. The first message in a string of arguments methodically affects the acceptance of the second message. When expectations are positively violated in the first message, the second will be persuasive. When expectations are negatively violated in the first message, the second will not be persuasive.

== The role of intensity ==
These propositions give rise to the impact of language intensity—defined by John Waite Bowers as a quality of language that "indicates the degree to which the speaker's attitude toward a concept deviates from neutrality"—on persuasive messages. Theorists have concentrated on two key areas: (1) intensity of language when it comes to gender roles and (2) credibility.

The perceived credibility of a source can greatly affect a message's persuasiveness. Researchers found that credible sources can enhance their appeal by using intense language; however, less credible speakers are more persuasive with low-intensity appeals. Similarly, females are less persuasive than males when they use intense language because it violates the expected behavior, but are more persuasive when they use low-intensity language. Males, however, are seen as weak when they argue in a less intense manner. Theorists argue further that females and speakers perceived as having low credibility have less freedom in selecting message strategies and that the use of aggressive language negatively violates expectations.

== Example ==
To better explain the theory we look at the expectations and societal norms for a man and a woman on their first date. If the man pushed for further physical intimacy after dinner, the societal expectation of a first date would be violated. The example below with Margret and Steve depicts such a scene.

Margret: "I had a really good time tonight, Steve. We should do it again."

Steve: "Let's cut the crap. Do you want to have sex?"

Margret: "Uhhh..."

Margret's language expectations of a first date were violated. Steve chooses an aggressive linguistic strategy. If Margret views Steve as a credible and appealing source, she may receive the message positively and, thus, the message would be persuasive. If Margret perceives Steve as an ambiguous or low-credible source, Steve will not be persuasive. In such a case, Steve should have used a low-aggressive message in his attempt to win Margret to his idea of having sex.

== Criticism ==
- Determining whether a positive or negative violation has occurred can be difficult. When there is no attitude or behavior change it may be concluded that a negative violation has occurred (possibly related to a boomerang effect). Conversely, when an attitude or behavior change does occur it may be too easy to conclude a positive violation of expectations has occurred.
- The theory has also been critiqued for being too "grand" in its predictive and explanatory goals. Burgoon counters that practical applications of his research conclusions are compelling enough to negate this criticism.

== See also ==
- Physician–patient interaction
- Social influence
