= Language intensity =

Quality of a language

Most investigators accept the definition of language intensity proposed by John Waite Bowers: a quality of language that "indicates the degree to which a speaker’s attitude toward a concept deviates from neutrality." Intensity as a lexical variable in communication studies has generated extensive empirical research.

== Theoretical setting ==
A theory proposed by Bradac, Bowers, and Courtright (1979, 1980) asserts causal relationships among intensity and a number of other psychological, social, and communication variables. An experimental study by Hamilton, Hunter, and Burgoon (1990) generally supports the relationships proposed by the theory at least in the limited domain of persuasion.

Intensity has been related to:

- Other message variables including verbal immediacy, lexical diversity, message style, and verbal aggressiveness.
- Psychological variables such as cognitive stress, arousal, and need for approval.
- Attributional variables including attributions of source internality, attributions of source competence, and attributions of source similarity with audience.
- Speaker–audience attitudinal congruency and discrepancy.
- Credibility of message sources and of messages.
- Information processing.
- Practical variables such as response rate in e-mail surveys and family interventions protecting children from ultraviolet radiation.
- Language expectancy theory
