= Adrian Furnham =

South African–born British psychologist

- Born: Adrian Frank Furnham; 3 February 1953 (age 73); Port Shepstone, South Africa
- Citizenship: British
- Scientific career
- Fields: Psychology
- Workplaces: University College London (1992–present); BI Norwegian Business School (2009–present)
- Doctoral advisor: Michael Argyle
- Website: adrianfurnham.com

Adrian Frank Furnham (born 3 February 1953) is a South African–born British BPS chartered occupational psychologist and chartered health psychologist. He is currently an adjunct professor at BI Norwegian Business School and a professor at University College London. Throughout his career, he has lectured in the following post-secondary institutions: Pembroke College, Oxford, University of New South Wales, University of the West Indies, Hong Kong University Business School, and Henley Management College.

Furnham has a broad range of research interests within the field of psychology. He has explored topics within applied, economic, health, occupational, social and differential psychology. As of 2018, he has published 92 books and over 1,200 peer-reviewed journal articles.

Furnham is a fellow of the British Psychological Society; he was granted the British Psychological Society Award for Academic Contribution to Practice in 2011.

== Early life ==
Furnham was born on 3 February 1953 to British parents in Port Shepstone, in the Union of South Africa. He was an only child. His father was a newspaper printer and publisher, and his mother was a nurse.

== Education ==
In 1970, at the age of sixteen, he began his university education at the University of Natal Pietermaritzburg Campus, completing a Bachelor of Arts degree in 1972 and an Honours Bachelor of Arts degree in 1973, focusing on history, psychology, and theology. He completed his Master of Arts in 1974, composing his thesis on cross-cultural conformity and field dependence. In 1975, he completed an economics master's degree at the University of London, focusing his research on verbal, vocal, and visual cues and perception. He later completed a Master of Science at the University of Strathclyde, where he researched sex and class factors in the perception of social episodes. In 1981, Furnham completed a doctorate at Oxford and later received a DSc from London in 1991 and a DLitt from Natal in 1997.

== Career ==
Adrian Furnham is currently a professor of psychology at University College London. Before his current placement, he had previously lectured at numerous institutes, including Pembroke College, Oxford, the University of New South Wales, and the University of the West Indies. Furthermore, he also taught management at both the Hong Kong University Business School and Henley Management College. In 2009, he was appointed adjunct professor of management at the Norwegian School of Management.

Furnham has been recognized as a Chartered Occupational Psychologist. In addition to his professorial roles at several universities, Furnham is an active member of many different associations. He is a Fellow of the British Psychological Society, and was identified as the second most productive psychologist in 1995. He is also currently the elected president of the International Society for the Study of Individual Differences, as well as the founder and director of Applied Behavioral Research Associates (ABRA), a psychological consultancy. Furnham's work was used at universities and other associations. He also consulted for many international companies in assisting them with top team development, creating systems for performance management, psychometric testing, and developing leadership skills. Following these experiences, he was elected Fellow of the Leadership Trust in 2010, Academician of the Learned Society of the Social Sciences in 2010, and received the British Psychological Society Award for Academic Contribution in 2011.

He has written over 92 books, and many of them have been translated into different languages, including Chinese, French, German, Italian, Japanese, Korean, Polish, Russian, Portuguese, and Spanish. Alongside his books, Furnham has written newspaper pieces for Financial Times, Guardian, Telegraph, Daily Mail, Times Higher Education Supplement, Sunday Times, and contributed to various magazines, including: The Spectator, Personnel Management, New Scientist, Across the Board and Spotlight, in both Europe and North America. He has been a columnist in multiple management magazines such as Mastering Management and Human Resources. He is also a regular contributor to national and international radio and television channels such as BBC, CNN, and ITV.

== Research ==
=== Themes ===
==== Psychometric housekeeping and reviews ====
Furnham has documented different scales that measure the same thing and compared their validity and reliability. He did this through reviewing old and new personality tests. Some examples of his extensive reviews include Tolerance of Ambiguity (co-authored with Ribchester and Marks), Belief in a Just World, and the Protestant Work Ethic.

==== Test development ====
Furnham has developed several tests throughout his career. He adapted existing ideas to create specific measures such as the Economic Locus of Control in 1986 and the Organisational Attributional Style Questionnaire in 1992. He co-developed the Trait Emotional Intelligence Questionnaire, a self-report inventory that assesses the sampling domain of trait emotional intelligence, with his PhD student Dino Petrides in 2006. He also developed the High Flyer Trait Inventory (formerly High Flying Personality Inventory), with his colleague Ian Macrae in 2014. The High Flyer Trait Inventory is a measure of personality traits directly related to workplace behaviours, thoughts, and perceptions of oneself and others.

==== The relationship between tests of preference and power ====
To this day, Furnham has maintained an interest in the distant relationship between the two pillars differential psychology. Furnham had given his opinion on this topic to the International Society for the Study of Individual differences. He works on this topic with the help of his PhD students.

==== Self-appraisal and awareness ====
Beginning early on Furnham took a great interest in self-awareness and self-estimating intelligence, in which he published many studies on. The findings of his studies revealed that males tend to estimate their general intelligence by 5-15 IQ points higher than females, that these sex differences persist across generations, and that they are cross-culturally consistent.

==== Dark side ====
Furnham was introduced to the dark side personality by Robert Hogan. Dark side personalities are those that portray dysfunctional behaviours and beliefs towards others. For instance, Psychopaths fall under this category. These types of people do not consider how their actions affect their reputation, and, although this may seem like deviant behaviour, it also seems to help them climb the corporate ladder. Dark side personality research was based on the DSM-III. Using the Hogan Development Survey in various studies, Furnham was able to collect sufficient amounts of data, which later on aided in studying misbehaviour at work. According to the HDS, mischievous people were considered to be extraverts, disagreeable, deliberate, and stable. They scored high on the excitement scale and low on the consciousness scale. Furnham has written multiple papers as well as two books on this topic.

== Publications ==
=== Books ===
As of 2019, he has written over 92 books and over 1,200 scientific papers, including:

- 1990: The Protestant Work Ethic
- 1994: Culture Shock
- 1994: Personality at Work
- 1995: The New Economic Mind
- 1996: The Myths of Management
- 1997: The Psychology of Behaviour at Work
- 1998: The Psychology of Money
- 2003: The Incompetent Manager
- 2004: The Dark Side of Behaviour at Work
- 2005: The People Business
- 2006: Management Mumbo-Jumbo
- 2007: Head and Heart Management
- 2008: Management Intelligence
- 2009: 50 Psychology Ideas You Really Need to Know
- 2009: The Elephant in the Boardroom: The Psychology of Leadership Derailment
- 2012: The Talented Manager
- 2015: High Potential
- 2017: Motivation and Performance

== Awards and achievements ==
- 2010: Elected Fellow of the Leadership Trust
- 2010: Elected Academician of the Learned Society of the Social Sciences
- 2011: Received the British Psychological Society Award for Academic Contribution to Practice
- 2017: Lifetime Achievement Award
