= Convergence (relationship) =

Relationship theory

The convergence hypothesis suggests that spouses and romantic partners tend to become more alike over time due to their shared environment, repeated interactions, and synchronized routines. For example, partners who often laugh and joke with each other, may experience less stress, which, over the years, may improve their health and social interactions. Yet, as detailed below, this hypothesis was not confirmed by empirical studies.

The convergence hypothesis became popular among social scientists and was widely used to explain the high levels of observed similarity between spouses and romantic partners in physical, physiological, demographic and psychological characteristics, such as social class, religion, height, intelligence, and education. Yet, empirical research shows that couples do not become more similar over time, but are similar from the outset. The similarity between spouses and romantic partners is explained by homogamy, (i.e., being socially and geographically surrounded by similar others) and homophily (i.e., preference for similar others).

== Studies ==
The study by Zajonc et al. found that the faces of spouses become more similar over time and that this similarity is positively correlated with couples' satisfaction in their marriage. The researchers suggest that this may be due to couples sharing similar environments and experiences, leading to similar facial features as a result. For example, couples who smile frequently may develop similar wrinkles around their eyes as a result.

More recent studies have called into question the hypothesis that spouses' faces become more similar over time, as suggested by Zajonc, et al For example, Stanford University psychologists, Tea-makorn and Kosinski conducted a study on a sample of 517 married couples using photographs taken at the beginning of their marriages and 20 to 69 years later. They used two independent approaches to measure the similarity of the spouses’ faces: human judges and a modern facial recognition algorithm. Their findings demonstrated that while spouses have similar facial features at the start of their marriage, these features do not continue to become more alike over time.

Hinsz found that couples married for 25 years were no more similar in appearance than recently engaged couples. Additionally, Griffith and Kunz found that while student raters were able to match spouses' faces at a level above chance, there was no significant trend of spouses growing to look alike as they lived together.

Research carried out by psychologists from the Michigan State University, and the University of Minnesota M. Brent Donnellan Mikhila N. Humbad, William G. Iacono, Matthew McGue and S. Alexandra Burt based on a database of 1,296 couples who have been married for an average of 19.8 years, suggested that only the degree of aggressivity actually tended to converge.They also found that couples who had been married for up to 39 years were no more alike in fundamental traits than newlyweds. They concluded that personalities do not grow more similar as years pass. The couples were more likely looking for specific traits during the courtship period and ended up with persons similar to themselves.
