= Immediacy (philosophy) =

Temporal philosophical concept

Immediacy is a philosophical concept related to time and temporal perspectives, both visual, and cognitive. Considerations of immediacy reflect on how we experience the world and what reality is. It implies a direct experience of an event or object bereft of any intervening medium. An example would be looking at a painting, losing awareness of the medium, and seeing the depiction as real. The medium is an important concept, and somewhat paradoxical, as it is both necessary and yet forgotten. Plato deals with a similar concept in the purity of experience. He tells us that speech is more immediate than writing, because the words emerge more directly from the speaker's mind. Immediacy also possesses characteristics of both of the homophonic heterographs 'immanent' and 'imminent', and what entails to both within ontology.

Immediacy also relates to the philosophy of phenomenology, as they are schools of thought which both concern subjective perceptions of objects and time.
