= Michael Argyle (psychologist) =

English social psychologist

- Born: August 11, 1925; Nottingham, England
- Died: September 6, 2002 (aged 77)
- Spouse: Sonia Kemp
- Children: 4

Academic background
- Education: University of Cambridge

Academic work
- Discipline: Social Psychology
- Institutions: University of Oxford

Michael Argyle (11 August 1925 – 6 September 2002) was one of the best known English social psychologists of the twentieth century. He spent most of his career at the University of Oxford, and worked on numerous topics. Throughout his career, he showed strong preferences for experimental methods in social psychology, having little time for alternative approaches such as discourse analysis.

== Life ==
Michael Argyle was born in Nottingham on 11 August 1925. He was educated at Nottingham High School for Boys. After completing with distinction a Royal Air Force science course at the University of Cambridge he trained as a navigator in Canada (1943-7). In June 1949 Michael married Sonia Kemp and they had four children, Miranda (1952), Nick (1954), Rosalind (1957) and Ophelia (1963). After the war he read part one in moral sciences at Emmanuel College, Cambridge and in 1950 graduated with first class honours in experimental psychology. Following two years of postgraduate study in Cambridge he became the first ever lecturer in social psychology at the University of Oxford, where he worked for many years. At the time, Oxford University was, along with the London School of Economics, one of only two universities in the United Kingdom to have a department of social psychology. He became a fellow of the newly founded Wolfson College, Oxford in 1966 and three years later a reader. He was one of the very early pioneers of social psychology in the UK and Europe and helped to initiate the British Journal of Social and Clinical Psychology as the first social psychology editor (1961-7). In 1968 he set up a social skills training programme at Littlemore Hospital, Oxford. He chaired the social psychology section of the British Psychological Society twice (1964-7, 1972-4). Distinguished psychologists and sociologists from all over the world visited the research group he set up at Oxford. He received honorary doctorates from the universities of Oxford (1979), Adelaide and Brussels (1982) and an honorary fellowship of the British Psychological Society (1992). In 1990 The International Society of the Study of Personal Relationships in 1990 gave him a distinguished career contribution award.

After his retirement, he became Professor Emeritus at Oxford Brookes University. He regularly attended social psychology conferences. He had a great passion for Scottish country dancing.

His wife Sonia died in 1999 and Argyle died on 6 September 2002, at the age of 77, of injuries suffered in a swimming accident.

== Work ==
Some of Argyle's best-known contributions were to this field. He was especially interested in gaze. One of his best-known books relevant to this field, The Psychology of Interpersonal Behaviour, became a best-seller. Argyle made contributions to many fields in psychology, including:

- psychology of religion
- social skills
- nonverbal communication
- the psychology of happiness
- the psychology of social class

=== Communication cycle ===
Argyle made modifications in 1972 to the communication cycle initially developed by Charles Berner in 1965. The communication cycle involves six steps: someone decides to communicate an idea, encodes it, and sends it; someone else receives it, decodes it and understands it. Feedback demonstrates understanding (e.g. an action is performed or a reply message is encoded and sent). The model allows for the possibility of distortion at either the encoding or decoding stage.

=== Psychology of religion ===
Argyle, a committed Christian, published empirical works on the psychology of religion. His early work in this field was summarized in his book Religious Behaviour (1958). He also collaborated with Benjman Beit-Hallahmi to produce a later book, "The Psychology of Religious Beliefs, Behaviour and Experience" (1997). Both books show Argyle's commitment to empiricism in psychology, and list results of surveys into topics such as beliefs in the afterlife or frequencies of religious experience in the general population.

=== Psychology of happiness ===
One of Argyle's most notable later contributions was to the psychology of happiness. Keen that more research should be done in this field, he published "The Psychology of Happiness" in 1987, 2nd edition 2001. In this book he listed and discussed empirical findings on happiness, including that happiness is indeed promoted by relationships, faith, sex, eating, exercise, music, success, etc., but probably not by wealth.

=== Psychology of social class ===
Although social class is a concept largely studied by soci

== Awards ==
=== Honorary doctorates ===
- 1979 University of Oxford
- 1982 University of Adelaide
- 1982 University of Brussels

=== Fellowships ===
- 1992 Honorary fellowship, British Psychological Society

== Publications ==
- The Scientific Study of Social Behaviour (Methuen 1957)
- Religious Behaviour (Routledge & Kegan Paul 1958)
- Training Managers (Acton Society Trust 1962), with Trevor Smith
- Psychology and Social Problems (Methuen 1964)
- The Psychology of Interpersonal Behaviour (Penguin 1967)
- Social Interaction (Tavistock Publications 1969)
- The Social Psychology of Work (Allen Lane 1972), ISBN 0-7139-0186-1
- Skills With People: A Guide for Managers (Hutchinson 1973), ISBN 0-09-116481-8, with Elizabeth Sidney and Margaret Brown
- Bodily Communication (Methuen 1975), ISBN 0-416-67450-X
- Gaze and Mutual Gaze (Cambridge University Press 1976), ISBN 0-521-20865-3, with Mark Cook
- Social Skills and Mental Health (Methuen 1978), ISBN 0-416-84980-6, with Peter Trower and Bridget Bryant
- Person to Person: Ways of Communicating (Harper & Row 1979), ISBN 0-06-318097-9, with Peter Trower
- Social Situations (Cambridge University Press 1981), ISBN 0-521-23260-0, with Adrian Furnham and Jean Ann Graham
- The Psychology of Happiness (Methuen 1987), ISBN 0-416-40960-1
- Cooperation: The Basis of Sociability (Routledge 1991), ISBN 0-415-03545-7
- The Social Psychology of Everyday Life (Routledge 1992), ISBN 0-415-01071-3
- The Psychology of Social Class (Routledge 1994), ISBN 0-415-07954-3
- The Social Psychology of Leisure (Penguin 1996), ISBN 0-14-023887-5
- The Psychology of Religious Behaviour, Belief and Experience (Routledge 1997), ISBN 0-415-12330-5, with Benjamin Beit-Hallahmi
- The Psychology of Money (Routledge 1998), ISBN 0-415-14605-4, with Adrian Furnham

plus numerous edited books, chapters, and articles in learned journals
