= Religion and personality =

Most scientists agree that religiosity (also called religiousness) is not an independent personality trait, despite there being some commonality between their characteristics. Religiosity and personality traits both relate to one's feelings, thoughts, and behaviors. However, unlike for personality, one's level of religiosity is often measured by the presence or lack of belief in and relationship with a higher power, certain lifestyles or behaviors adopted for a higher power, and a sense of belonging with other followers of one's religion. Additionally, personality traits tend to follow a normal distribution, such that the majority of individuals' scores for a personality trait will be concentrated towards the middle, rather than being extremely high or low. Distributions for religiosity, however, follow a non-normal distribution, such that there are more individuals who score particularly high or low on religiosity scales.

Examining religiosity as it relates to personality characteristics could provide an empirical way to study a difficult concept. With the use of modern, empirically tested personality measures, researchers can look for links and obtain quantitative results to provide insight into how and why religion is such an important element of being human. Overall, when the research on religiosity and personality is summarized, there does not appear to be a strong link between the two. While there is research to suggest that there is a modest relationship between mental ability and religiosity, mental ability is not considered an aspect of personality. It appears that, rather than by personality, religiosity is better explained by environment and upbringing, such that people are likely to maintain the beliefs of the household they grew up in. Research on religiosity is also limited in that much psychological research is biased to Western populations, and therefore research on religiosity and personality may also be skewed towards Western religions.

== Five-factor model of personality ==
The five-factor model of personality is currently accepted as a comprehensive model of personality. The five-factor model (FFM) identifies five broad traits (the Big Five) underlying the many, narrower traits that together can be used to describe personality. The identified traits are:

- Extraversion — outgoing, talkative, and sociable vs. reserved, shy, and withdrawn.
- Neuroticism — anxious, moody, and sensitive vs. relaxed and stable.
- Conscientiousness — organized, thorough, and precise vs. disorderly, careless, and unreliable.
- Agreeableness — cooperative, kind, and gentle vs. rude, harsh, and cold.
- Openness to Experience — unconventional, innovative, and complex vs. shallow, uninquisitive, and simple.

The Big Five are good for correlating with religiosity, because each trait is orthogonal, or completely independent from one another. In having the ability to separate each essential trait from the other, it is possible to study each personality characteristic and how it relates to religiosity.

Studying the psychology of religion through as it relates to personality is not a new idea, however. There has been research to both support and refute the ability of personality traits to explain religious or spiritual involvement. Research using Eysenck's model has found that religiosity in general is associated with low Openness to Experience, as well as low psychoticism, a factor associated inversely with Agreeableness and Conscientiousness. A review of studies examined the relations between the FFM and measures of religiosity, spiritual maturity, religious fundamentalism, and extrinsic religion. General religiosity was mainly related to Agreeableness and Conscientiousness of the Big Five traits. The same was found in a second review, which also noted that the relationship was consistent across different dimensions of religiosity, different cultures, and different measures of the Big Five. The relationship, however, appeared to be weaker in young adults than the rest of the adult population. Additionally, there was a weak positive correlation with Extraversion, and a very small but significant relationship with low Openness to Experience. This same study also found that the two different concepts of religiosity and spirituality both involve an overall compassionate attitude towards others and positively correlates with Agreeableness. Open, mature religiosity and spirituality were associated with high Openness to Experience, Extraversion, Agreeableness, and Conscientiousness, and with low Neuroticism. Religious fundamentalism was associated with higher Agreeableness, and lower Neuroticism and lower Openness to Experience. Because of these findings, those with higher religiosity scores seemed to be more altruistic and more well behaved. However, this correlation is pretty small. It is not known if religious people tend to be better behaved or if better behaved people are more attracted to religion. Extrinsic religiosity was associated with higher Neuroticism but unrelated to the other personality factors. Levels of Neuroticism among religiousness vary, with European samples exhibiting higher levels than in the United States, which was speculated to be due to the dominance of Catholicism in European samples.

Another study done on a group of Canadian university students, noted some differences between men and women as it related to their religiosity scores. According to this study, women tended to be more religious than men, but both men and women showed positive correlations of agreeableness and conscientiousness when compared to their religious involvement. Women who reported having no religious affiliation scored significantly higher in Neuroticism than those affiliated with a formal religion.

=== Strengths and weaknesses ===
As previously stated, one of the major strengths for using the FFM to study religiosity in people is that it is empirically tested and considered a reliable and valid measure. Another strength is that the Big Five is laid out simply, making it easier to use for examining potential links between personality and religiosity. While this is a huge strength, some research argues that its downfall lies in that it is solely a personality indicator, and is not compatible with religious or spiritual matters. For example, in another study that investigated the correlation between religiosity and the FFM, a conclusion was drawn that religiosity and/or spirituality should be made into a sixth personality factor in order to truly make research using this model accurate.

Additionally, many of the relationships between personality and religion were small. Religiousness has also been correlated with other personality traits not encompassed by the FFM. Therefore, more research is needed to determine if the FFM is an accurate way to examine relationships between personality and religiosity and to determine if there are significant relationships.

== HEXACO model ==
While the Big Five is the most commonly used model of personality, newer personality research suggests that the HEXACO model may be an improvement on the Big Five. However, to shed light on what the Big Five is and why the HEXACO model allows for a greater way to correlate religiosity and personality, understanding the Big Five is likely beneficial. In addition, the Big Five have been defined as openness to experience, conscientiousness, extraversion, agreeableness, and neuroticism. Each trait allows for its own characteristics, such as: openness to experience reflects the degree of intellectual curiosity, creativity and a preference for novelty and variety a person has; conscientiousness is the tendency to be organized and dependable; extraversion is when one shows positive emotions, assertiveness, sociability; agreeableness is when one is considered to be compassionate and cooperative; lastly, neuroticism is when one experiences unpleasant emotions easily, such as anger, anxiety, depression, and vulnerability. The HEXACO model makes slight modification to the factors of the Big Five traits, but most notably it adds a sixth trait Honesty-Humility, which captures an individual's tendency towards honesty, humility, sincerity, greed-avoidance, and modesty. Religiosity has been positively correlated to Honesty-Humility, such that individuals who score higher on religiousness were also likely to score higher for Honesty-Humility.

It is unclear, however, if these results would be replicated in other studies.

== Other personality traits related to religiosity ==
While some traits from the Big Five and the HEXACO model have been correlated with religiosity, these models do not encompass all known personality traits.

Traits such as femininity and conservatism have both been linked to religiosity, such that those who scored higher on religiousness were likely to also score higher for femininity and conservatism. Religiosity was negatively correlated with traits relating to sexual expression, such as eroticism, sexiness, and sensuality, such that individuals who scored higher on religiosity tended to score lower on these factors of sexuality. Humour has also been negatively correlated with religiosity, such that individuals who scored higher on religiousness tended to score lower on humour.

Many of the links between traits and religiosity have not been looked at on a larger scale like traits from the Five Factor Model have. Therefore, these results may not replicate in future research and may not be accurate.

== Attachment theory ==
Attachment Theory is another example of a personality indicator with the ability to help researchers understand religiosity and spirituality. The basic premise of attachment theory is that infants form relationships with their caregivers, and the type of attachment influences an individual's personality and future relationships. It is thought that these future relationships could be with the particular god or higher power.

In attachment theory, there have been four attachment styles identified:

- secure attachment — confidence in the availability of caregiver during times of need.
- anxious-avoidant attachment — avoidance and ignoring of caregiver, due to insecurity and lack of trust in the ability of others to care for one's needs.
- anxious-ambivalent attachment — a mixture of seeking behaviors and ambivalence towards caregiver, due to the caregiver's unpredictable responses.
- disorganized/disoriented attachment — mixed, contradictory behaviors towards caregiver, often including displays of fear.

Secure attachment styles are believed to have positive outcomes for individuals' personality and future relationships, while disrupted attachment styles are believed to be related to disordered personalities, antisocial behaviors, and life-course persistent criminal behaviors. Attachment theory is also thought to be related to religiosity, because a relationship with God can mirror relationships with an adult attachment figure. Additionally, much like Attachment Theory describes with separation from caregivers, a sense of separation from God has been reported to invoke similar distress.

The research varies in explaining which types of attachment style might yield a particular relationship with God. For example, in one study, a secure relationship with one's parents was associated with a secure attachment to God. One theory, the correspondence pathway theory, suggests that individual differences in attachment style lead to differences in religious beliefs, such that an individual with an insecure attachment could be led to either agnosticism and atheism or they could develop an emotional, dependent relationship with God. However, other research has shown a compensatory effect, such that individuals feel the need to make up for something that is lacking. For instance, someone with an insecure attachment style with their parents may in turn have a very secure, confident relationship with God to compensate for what their parents did not sufficiently provide them.

=== Strengths and weaknesses ===
While some research suggests that there could be links between attachment styles and religiosity, as well as between attachment styles and personality outcomes, it is not yet clear the precise mechanisms behind either and there does not yet appear to be a general consensus across studies. Additionally, more research is needed to determine any links between attachment theory, religiosity, and personality.

== Object relations theory ==
Object relations theory describes how children relate or associate different emotions with different people (objects). The theory says that children associate these emotions to the objects based on how they currently view the world around them. For example, kids might associate the emotion of something good with mother, and bad with something like criminals. In relating this with religious ideals, it seems natural that the same concept should apply. One's relationship with God should, in theory, be traced back to association.

In this theory, it is hypothesized that the person ends up creating an idea of God according to what the individual needs, and how he or she perceives the world. This view of personality and religion does not focus on how each person differs trait wise, but it centers on the type of relationship the individual has with God.

=== Strengths and weaknesses ===
An important aspect to keep in mind with Object Relations theory is that it is highly theoretical. This is a weakness in the sense that all data is based on a concept that cannot be objectively verified, and thus may not be reliable or valid. As with all inquiries about the psychological nature of religion, it is difficult to find valid and reliable measures because of the introspective nature of the subject. That being said, there is something that we can learn from this field of study. By analyzing how this theory of personality development correlates with one's attachment to a religious deity, we can hopefully begin to understand how important association, and perception is to religious ideals.

== Religious struggles and personality ==
Research has shown that struggling with religion correlates to some basic personality traits. Studies on the Big Five, as well as factors such as entitlement, self-esteem, and self-compassion suggest that there is a significant relationship between religious uncertainty and personality.

Those who are high in Neuroticism may have a hard time trying to find purpose in their life. Several studies have also suggested that people higher in Neuroticism tend to have a more negative relationship with God. This correlates with divine struggles as they may encounter distress when it comes to finding the meaning of life as well as recognizing divine figures of religions. Both Agreeableness and Conscientiousness have been associated with lower levels of anger with God, whereas Neuroticism has been linked with higher levels of anger with God. Extraversion, however, has not been found to correlate with religious struggles. Very little evidence is available to suggest that Openness to Experience is linked to religious struggles, but it is thought that those who are high in Openness to Experience may carry more doubt in religion compared to those who are lower in Openness to Experience. Even when controlling for the Big Five, there is evidence to suggest that entitlement, self-esteem, and self-compassion might be able to predict religious struggles. A reason for divine struggles of entitled people is possibly due to their tendency to feel victimized and angry, thus they may not have a positive relationship with God. High levels of self-esteem and self-compassion may have a link with positive spiritual well-being. Over time, this should translate to less moral and religious struggles. However, lower levels of self-esteem and compassion have been associated with more religious struggles. While certain findings have indicated that personality may predispose some individuals to religious struggles, the findings are weak. There is also no research on how personality is affected by religion over time.

== Religion and life satisfaction ==
Research done by Salsman, Brown, Brechting, and Carlson showed a positive correlation between religion and life satisfaction of about 0.2 to 0.3. It was shown by Salsman that those who practice religion have a generally more positive outlook on life. Many elements of religion have been studied to determine which aspects impact one's life satisfaction. It was found that both personal and organizational religion can lead to an increased life satisfaction. Individual prayer, a feeling of intimacy with the divine, and meditation were all linked to greater psychological well-being and life satisfaction. When it came to organizational religion, people felt a greater satisfaction knowing that they belonged to a group, had a support system from the church, and felt fulfilled when they increased their participation within the church's community.

People who feel conflicted about religion may encounter a decline in their health, both mentally and physically. Research has shown that those who have religious struggles could have higher depression and anxiety levels. The risk of suicide is even elevated when struggle is present within religion. These struggles have been linked to a separation from the church or the divine; however, the cause for the separation is unknown and may stem from different events throughout life such as a traumatic death in the family, difficult life events, or a mental battle between oneself. It is likely people who are religiously conflicted show a decline in health, compared to religious people, due to a lack of community support or ability to manage stress. Since a religious community can offer psychological, social, or financial support, it may help buffer stress or help individuals recover from hardship. Not only can religious people benefit from the community, but they can possibly benefit from prayer or meditation. Although, more research is needed to validate the causes of religious separation and how it affects one's personality.

== Religion and the Myers–Briggs Type Indicator ==
The Myers–Briggs Type Indicator, or MBTI, uses four dichotomies to indicate a person's psychological preference. When used in studies alongside religion, it has been shown that NT types, mostly INTP and ENTP, are more likely to be atheist. However, a large portion of Greek Orthodox is ISTJ as well. In addition, the "judging" (J) type is common among evangelical and Protestants. ESFJ and ENFJ personality types are more interested in becoming ministers than other types. ENFJs are more attracted to becoming ministers of liberal denominations, while ESFJs are more interested in becoming ministers in conservative denominations.

The Myers–Briggs Personality Type Indicator, although popular, is flawed. Therefore, correlations between MBTI types and religiosity may not be valid and reliable.

== Religiosity and paranormal beliefs ==
Most religions are based around a belief in some sort of supernatural being. This may lead some to believe that religiosity would relate in someway to the belief in other paranormal beings. According to Thalbourne, evidence suggests that people who are religious tend to have paranormal beliefs. One possible explanation for this is to try to reduce anxiety about dying. Other research conducted by Thalbourne, Dunbar, and Delin, found Conscientiousness and Neuroticism may be a predictor of paranormal beliefs. Furthermore, Aarnio and Lindeman conducted research to confirm the relationship between religion and paranormal beliefs. One of their findings was that individuals who were believers were more neurotic than skeptics. However, it is possible this is due to the type of religion an individual belongs to. Nevertheless, multiple studies have found little correlation between these two beliefs. This could be due to the fact that many religions discourage their members from thinking too much of paranormal beings, as they are thought to be evil.

== Religion as a personality characteristic ==
While there are many who believe religion has a strong influence on personality development, some believe it may be a personality trait on its own. Vassilis Saroglou, for example, has developed on the idea by introducing four traits of personality that are developed by religion: believing, bonding, behaving, and belonging. Believing refers to someone accepting the belief in a supernatural being or world. Bonding is how important religion is to the self and how it connects them to something larger than themselves. Behaving is how someone changes their own lifestyle to appease their spiritual beliefs. Belonging is the identity one acquires from believing in a religion. This concept, published in 2011, applies to religion cross-culturally and to a wide range of spirituality.

== See also ==
- Religion and coping with trauma
