= Role of Christianity in Western education =

Christian organizations have a long tradition of supporting Western education. The Catholic Church in particular founded and continues to run hundreds of thousands of educational institutions. The first universities in Europe were founded by Catholicism. By contrast, the educational tradition of North America tended to have Protestant roots—though still being mostly Christian in origin. Western style education, usually hand-in-hand with Christianity, were also spread to non-Western regions as Western colonialism spread through the world. This has resulted in Christians being the second most educated religious group in the world, but has also created serious regional differences in educational attainment by religion, especially in Africa.

== Statistics ==
A Pew Center study about religion and education around the world in 2016, found that Christians ranked as the second most educated religious group around in the world after Jews with an average of 9.3 years of schooling, and the highest of years of schooling among Christians found in Germany (13.6), New Zealand (13.5) and Estonia (13.1). Christians were also found to have the second highest number of graduate and post-graduate degrees per capita while in absolute numbers ranked in the first place (220 million). Between the various Christian communities, Singapore outranks other nations in terms of Christians who obtain a university degree in institutions of higher education (67%), followed by the Christians of Israel (63%), and the Christians of Georgia (57%).

According to the study, Christians in North America, Europe, Middle East, North Africa and Asia-Pacific regions are highly educated since many of the world universities were built by the historic Christian Churches, in addition to the historical evidence that "Christian monks built libraries and, in the days before printing presses, preserved important earlier writings produced in Latin, Greek and Arabic". According to the same study, Christians have a significant amount of gender equality in educational attainment, and the study suggests that one of the reasons is the encouragement of the Protestant Reformers in promoting the education of women, which led to the eradication of illiteracy among females in Protestant communities. According to the same study "there is a large and pervasive gap in educational attainment between Muslims and Christians in sub-Saharan Africa" as Muslim adults in this region are far less educated than their Christian counterparts, with scholars suggesting that this gap is due to the educational facilities that were created by Christian missionaries during the colonial era for fellow believers.

== Catholicism ==
The number of Catholic institutions as of 2000
Institutions	#
Parishes and missions	408,637
Primary and secondary schools	125,016
Universities	1,046
Hospitals	5,853
Orphanages	8,695
Homes for the elderly and handicapped	13,933
Dispensaries, leprosaries, nurseries and other institutions	74,936

Missionary activity for the Catholic Church has always incorporated education of evangelized peoples as part of its social ministry. History shows that in evangelized lands, the first people to operate schools were Roman Catholics. In some countries, the Church is the main provider of education or significantly supplements government forms of education. Presently, the Church operates the world's largest non-governmental school system. Many of Western Civilization's most influential universities were founded by the Catholic Church.

=== Europe ===
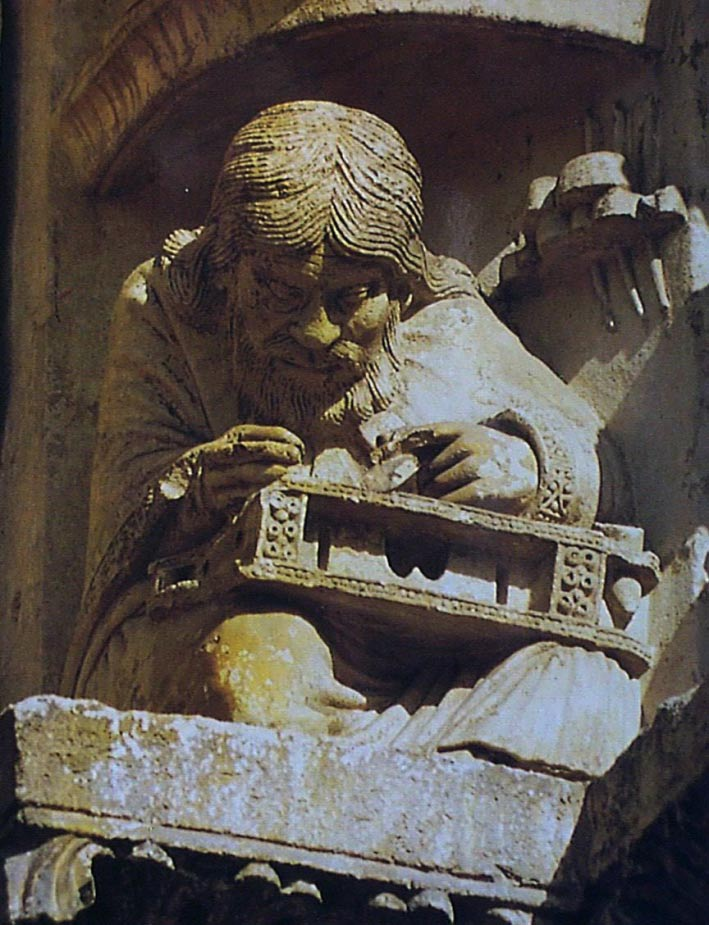
Pythagoras on one of the archivolts at Chartres Cathedral. From Medieval Europe's Cathedral Schools grew many of Europe's modern universities.

The coat of arms of the University of Oxford, bearing the Latin motto The Lord is my Light. Europe's universities were essentially a Catholic invention.

The Catholic Church founded the West's first universities, which were preceded by the schools attached to monasteries and cathedrals, and generally staffed by monks and friars.

In 530, Saint Benedict wrote his monastic Rule, which became a blueprint for the organization of monasteries throughout Europe. The new monasteries preserved classical craft and artistic skills while maintaining intellectual culture within their schools, scriptoria and libraries. As well as providing a focus for spiritual life, they functioned as agricultural, economic and production centers, particularly in remote regions, becoming major conduits of civilization.

The Cluniac reform of monasteries that had begun in 910 sparked widespread monastic growth and renewal. Monasteries introduced new technologies and crops, fostered the creation and preservation of literature and promoted economic growth. Monasteries, convents and cathedrals still operated virtually all schools and libraries.

Cathedral schools began in the Early Middle Ages as centers of advanced education, some of them ultimately evolving into medieval universities. During the High Middle Ages, Chartres Cathedral operated the famous and influential Chartres Cathedral School.

Universities began springing up in Italian towns like Salerno, whose Schola Medica Salernitana, established in the 9th Century, became a leading medical school and translated the work of Greek and Arabic physicians into Latin. Bologna University founded in 1088 became the most influential of the early universities, which first specialised in canon law and civil law. Paris University founded in 1150 but formed from a pre–existing cathedral school, specialising in such topics as theology, came to rival Bologna under the supervision of Notre Dame Cathedral. Oxford University founded in 1096, later came to rival Paris in Theology, while Salamanca University was founded in Spain in 1243. According to the historian Geoffrey Blainey, the universities benefited from the use of Latin, the common language of the Church, and its internationalist reach, and their role was to "teach, argue and reason within a Christian framework". The medieval universities of Western Christendom were well-integrated across all of Western Europe, encouraged freedom of enquiry and produced a great variety of fine scholars and natural philosophers, including Robert Grosseteste of the University of Oxford, an early expositor of a systematic method of scientific experimentation; and Saint Albert the Great, a pioneer of biological field research

In the 13th century, mendicant orders were founded by Francis of Assisi and Dominic de Guzmán which brought consecrated religious life into urban settings. These orders also played a large role in the development of cathedral schools into universities, the direct ancestors of the modern Western institutions. Notable scholastic theologians such as the Dominican Thomas Aquinas worked at these universities, his Summa Theologica was a key intellectual achievement in its synthesis of Aristotelian thought and Christianity.

The Spaniard St Ignatius Loyola founded the Society of Jesus (Jesuits) in 1540. Initially a missionary order, the Jesuits took Western learning and the Catholic faith to India, Japan, China, Canada, Central and South America and Australia. The order became increasingly involved in education, founding schools, colleges and universities across the globe and educating such notable Western scholars, intellectuals, artists and statesmen as René Descartes, Matteo Ricci, Voltaire, Pierre de Coubertin, Sir Arthur Conan Doyle, James Joyce, Alfred Hitchcock, Bing Crosby, Robert Hughes and Bill Clinton.

According to the historian Geoffrey Blainey, the university became a hallmark of Christian Civilisation, though, he writes, "in the most recent century perhaps no institution has done more to promote an alternative or secular view of the world".

=== Latin America ===
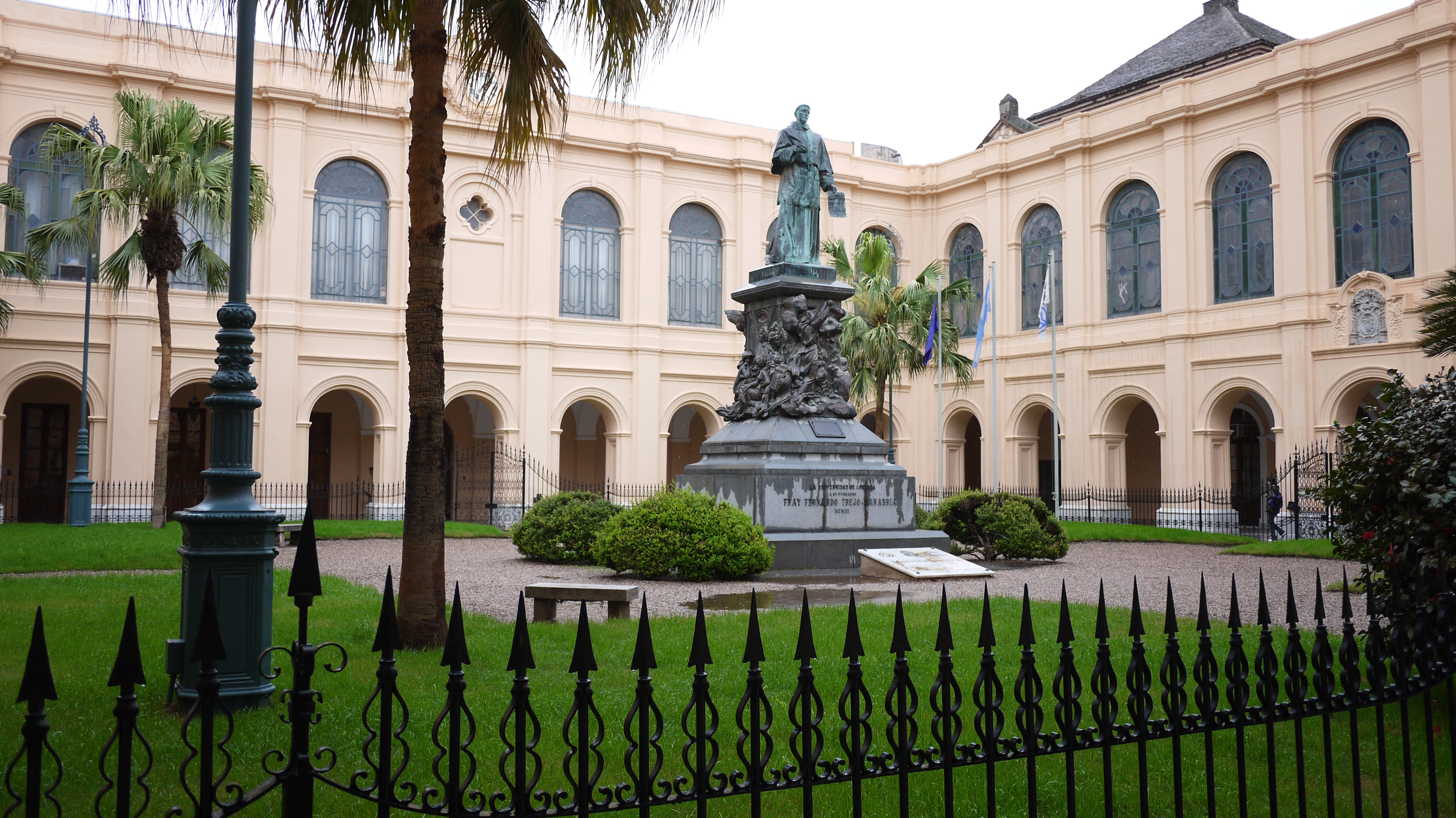
National University of Córdoba in Córdoba, Argentina, founded in 1613 by the Jesuit

Education in Latin American began under the direction of missionaries who were sponsored by the Spanish crown. Royal policy stipulated that the Amerindians had to accept missionaries but they did not have to convert. Indians who agreed to listen to the missionaries were not subjected to work for encomenderos some of whom were notorious for brutal conditions.

A key role in the development of the university system in Latin America was played by the Catholic orders, especially by the Jesuits, but also the Dominicans and Augustinians. The founding and operation of most universities resulted from the – usually local – initiative of one of these orders, which sometimes quarreled openly over the control of the campus and the curriculum. The (temporary) dissolution of the Jesuit order in the late 18th century proved to be a major setback for the university landscape in Latin America, several of the suppressed Jesuit universities were reopened only decades later.

=== North America ===
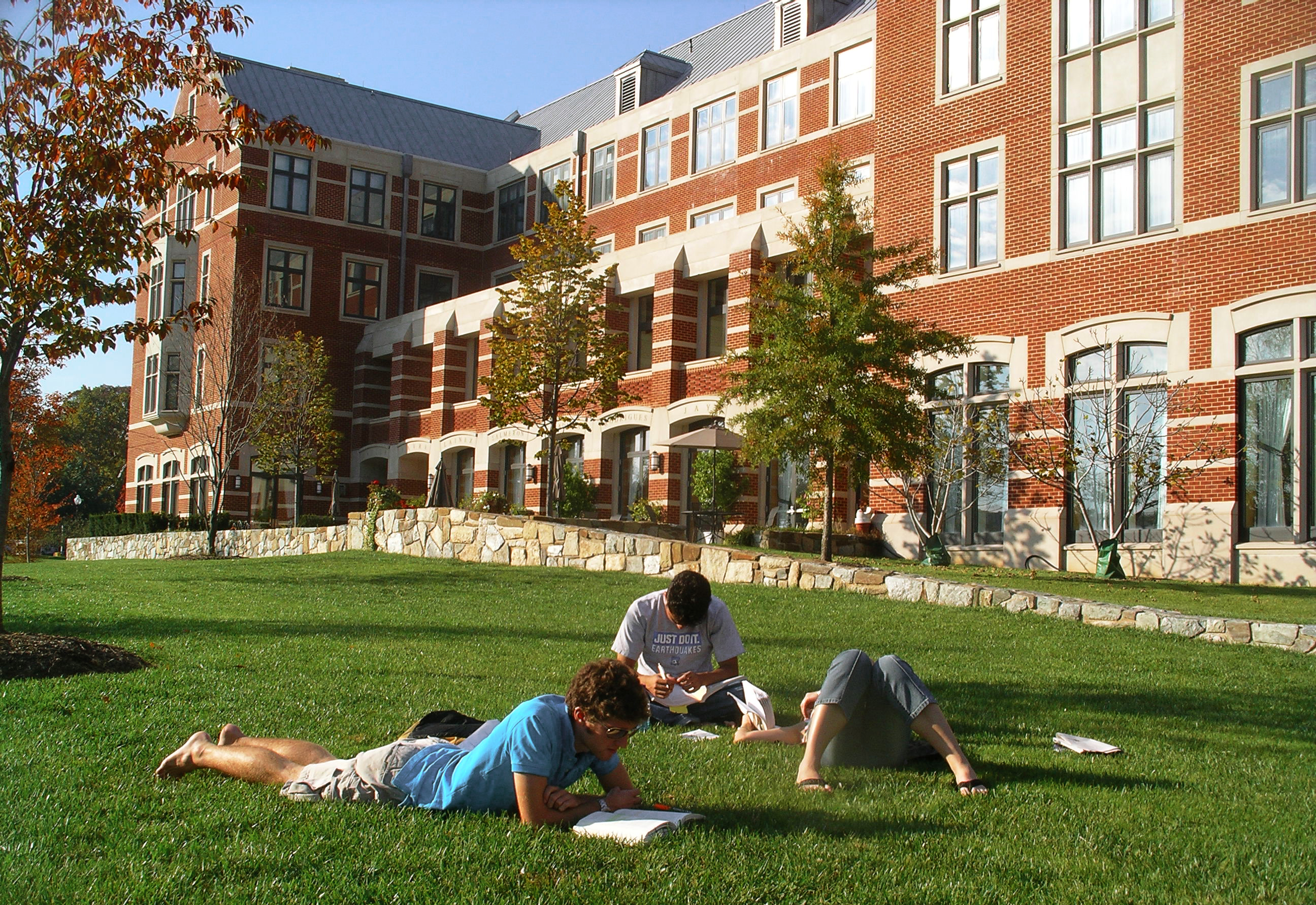
Students studying outside Wolfington Hall Jesuit Residence, Georgetown University, US

A number of Catholic universities, schools and colleges have been formed in the United States. The religious tolerance established by the American Revolution enabled the Catholic clergy of Maryland to found Georgetown University, America's oldest Catholic university, in 1789 and it became a Jesuit institution in 1805. Saint Katharine Drexel inherited a fortune and established the Sisters of the Blessed Sacrament for Indians and Colored People (now known as the Sisters of the Blessed Sacrament), founded schools across America and started Xavier University of Louisiana in New Orleans in 1925 for the education of African Americans.

=== Australasia ===
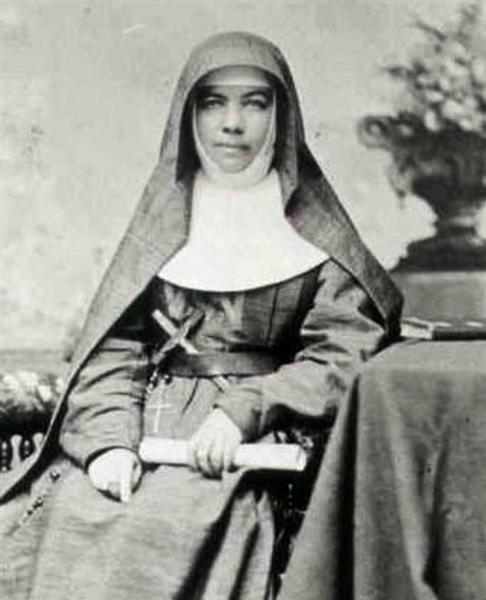
Saint Mary MacKillop, Australia's first saint

From 19th-century foundations, the Catholic education system in Australia has grown to be the second biggest sector after government schools with around 21 per cent of all secondary school enrolments. The Church has established primary, secondary and tertiary educational institutions. St Mary MacKillop was a 19th-century Australian nun who founded an educational religious institute, the Sisters of St Joseph of the Sacred Heart, and in 2010 became the first Australian to be canonised as a saint. Catholic education is also significant in neighbouring South Pacific nations: 11% of New Zealand students attend Catholic schools

=== Africa ===
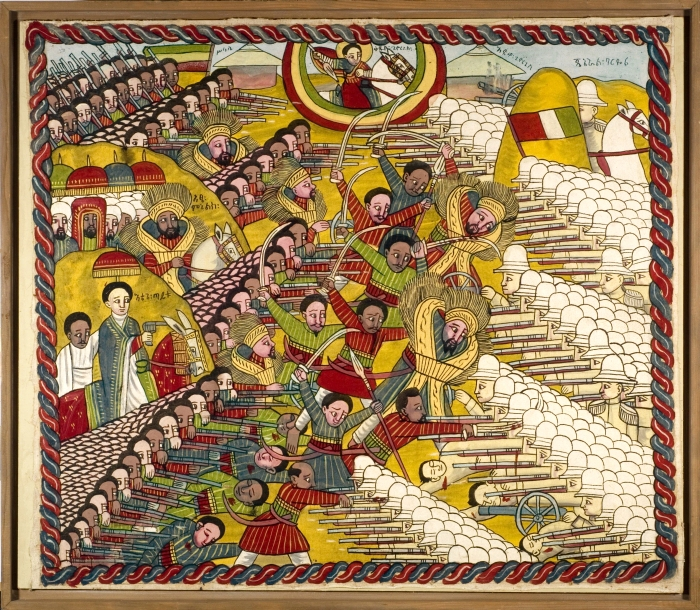
Ethiopian forces, assisted by St. George (top), win the battle against Italian invaders. Painted 1965–1975.

By the close of the 19th century, European powers had managed to gain control of most of the African interior. The new rulers introduced cash-based economies which created an enormous demand for literacy and a western education—a demand which for most Africans could only be satisfied by Christian missionaries.Catholic missionaries followed colonial governments into Africa, and built schools, hospitals, monasteries and churches.

With a high number of adult baptisms, the Church is growing faster in Africa than anywhere else. It also operates a greater number of Catholic schools per parish here (3:1) than in other areas of the world.

According to Heather Sharkey, the real impact of the activities of the missionaries is still a topic open to debate in academia today. Sharkey asserted that "the missionaries played manifold roles in colonial Africa and stimulated forms of cultural, political and religious change." "Historians still debate the nature of their impact and question their relation to the system of European colonialism in the continent." She noted that the missionaries provided crucial social services such as modern education and health care that would have otherwise not been available in Africa. Sharkey said that, in societies that were traditionally male-dominated, female missionaries provided women with health care knowledge and basic education. A Pew Center study about religion and education around the world in 2016, found that "there is a large and pervasive gap in educational attainment between Muslims and Christians in sub-Saharan Africa" as Muslim adults in this region are far less educated than their Christian counterparts, with scholars suggesting that this gap is due to the educational facilities that were created by Christian missionaries during the colonial era for fellow believers.

=== Asia ===
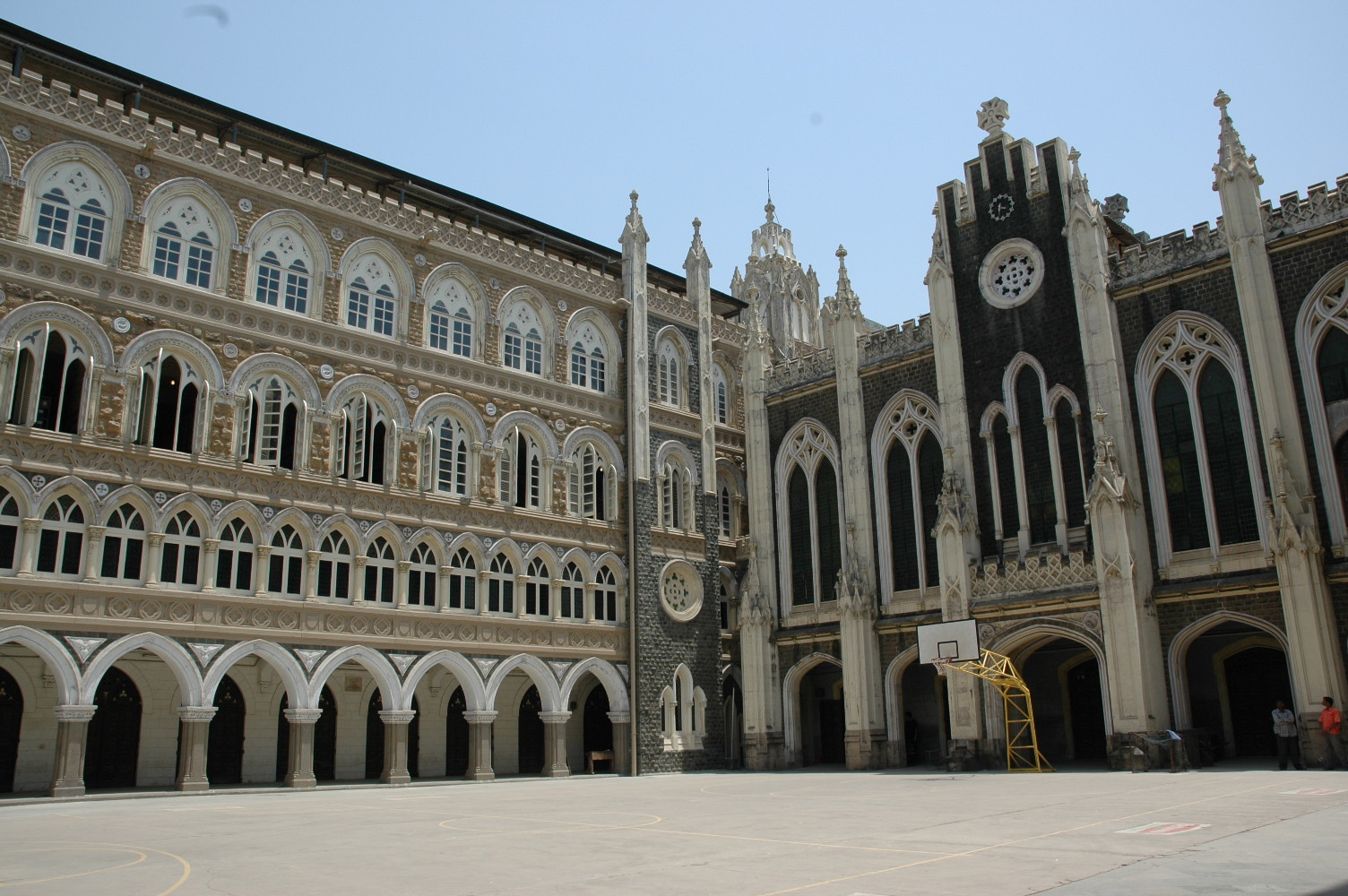
The Catholic St. Xavier's College in Mumbai is one of the most prestigious liberal arts colleges in India.

Christ Church College (1866) and St. Stephen's College (1881) are two examples of prominent church-affiliated educational institutions founded during the British Raj. Within educational institutions established during the British Raj, Christian texts, especially the Bible, were a part of the curricula. During the British Raj, Christian missionaries developed writing systems for Indian languages that previously did not have one. Christian missionaries in India also worked to increase literacy and also engaged in social activism, such as fighting against prostitution, championing the right of widowed women to remarry, and trying to stop early marriages for women.

In India, over 25,000 schools and colleges are operated by the Church. The Jesuits' educational institutions have left a prestigious impact through their education institutions. Education has become the major priority for the Church in India in recent years with nearly 60% of the Catholic schools situated in rural areas. Even in the early part of the 19th century, Catholic schools had emphasised relief for the poor and their welfare.

== Protestantantism ==
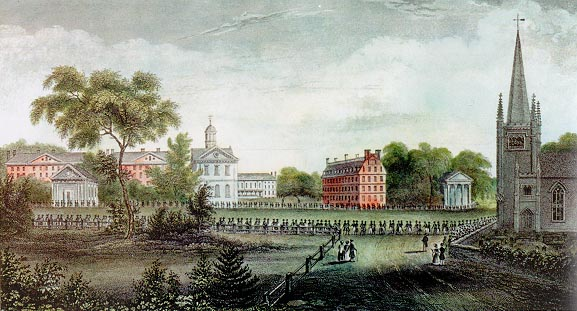
Harvard College, historically one of several favored undergraduate schools for the Protestant elite. Seen here is the 1836 Harvard alumni procession.

As the Reformers wanted all members of the church to be able to read the Bible, education on all levels got a strong boost. Compulsory education for both boys and girls was introduced. For example, the Puritans who established Massachusetts Bay Colony in 1628 founded Harvard College only eight years later. Seven of the first nine of what are called colonial colleges were founded by Christians, including Columbia University, Brown University, Rutgers University and Yale University (1701); a nineteenth-century book on "Colleges in America" says, "Eighty three percent of the colleges in [the U.S.] were founded by Christian philanthropy." Pennsylvania also became a centre of learning as one of the colleges not specifically Christian. Princeton University was a Presbyterian foundation.

A large number of mainline Protestants have played leadership roles in many aspects of American life, including politics, business, science, the arts, and education. They founded most of the country's leading institutes of higher education.

The private schools and colleges established by the mainline Protestant denominations, as a rule, still want to be known as places that foster values, but few will go so far as to identify those values as Christian. ... Overall, the distinctiveness of mainline Protestant identity has largely dissolved since the 1960s.

Protestantism also initiated translations of the Bible into national languages and thereby supported the development of national literatures. Episcopalians and Presbyterians tend to be considerably wealthier and better educated than most other religious groups.

== See also ==
- Christian school
- Catholic school
- Cathedral school
- Catholic university
- Medieval university
