= Interpersonal deception theory =

Communications theory

Interpersonal deception theory (IDT) is one of a number of theories that attempts to explain how individuals handle actual (or perceived) deception at the conscious or subconscious level while engaged in face-to-face communication. The theory was put forth by David B. Buller and Judee Burgoon in 1996 to explore this idea that deception is an engaging process between receiver and deceiver. IDT assumes that communication is not static; it is influenced by personal goals and the meaning of the interaction as it unfolds. IDT is no different from other forms of communication since all forms of communication are adaptive in nature. The sender's overt (and covert) communications are affected by the overt and covert communications of the receiver, and vice versa. IDT explores the interrelation between the sender's communicative meaning and the receiver's thoughts and behavior in deceptive exchanges.

Hence, it is safe to say that IDT can also be referred to as a game of moves and countermoves by the deceiver and the deceived.

Intentional deception requires greater cognitive exertion than truthful communication, regardless of whether the sender attempts falsification (lying), concealment (omitting material facts) or equivocation (skirting issues by changing the subject or responding indirectly).

== Theoretical perspective ==
IDT views deception through the lens of interpersonal communication, considering deception as an interactive process between sender and receiver. In contrast with previous studies of deception (which focused on the sender and receiver individually), IDT focuses on the dyadic and relational nature of deceptive communication. Behaviors by sender and receiver are dynamic, multifunctional, multidimensional and multi-modal.

Dyadic communication is communication between two people; a dyad is a group of two people between whom messages are sent and received. Relational communication is communication in which meaning is created by two people simultaneously filling the roles of sender and receiver. Dialogic activity is the active communicative language of the sender and receiver, each relying upon the other in the exchange. "Both individuals within the communicative situation are actively participating in strategies to obtain or achieve goals set by themselves. The decision to actively deceive or not, is not that of a passive nature, it is done with intent by both individuals during the conversation".

In psychotherapy and psychological counseling, dyadic, relational and dialogic activity between therapist and patient relies on honest, open communication if the patient is to recover and be capable of healthier relationships. Deception uses the same theoretical framework in reverse; the communication of one participant is deliberately false.

== History ==
Current research literature documents well that human beings are poor detectors of deception. Research reveals that accuracy rates of people's ability to tell truth from deception are only a little above chance (54%). Concerningly, observers perform slightly worse given only visual information (52% accuracy) and better when they can hear (but not see) the target person (63%), While experts are more confident than laypersons, they are not more accurate.

Interpersonal Deception Theory (IDT) attempts to explain the manner in which individuals engaged in face-to-face communication deal with actual or perceived deception on the conscious and subconscious levels. IDT proposes that the majority of individuals overestimate their ability to detect deception. In some cultures, various means of deception are acceptable while other forms are not. Acceptance of deception can be found in language terms that classify, rationalize or condemn, such behavior. Deception that may be considered a simple white lie to save feelings may be deemed socially acceptable, while deception used to gain certain advantages can be determined to be ethically questionable. It has been estimated that "deception and suspected deception arise in at least one quarter of all conversations".

Interpersonal deception detection between partners is difficult unless a partner tells an outright lie or contradicts something the other partner knows is true. While it is difficult to deceive a person over a long period of time, deception often occurs in day-to-day conversations between relational partners. Maintaining a deception over time is difficult because it places a significant cognitive load on the deceiver. The deceiver must recall previous statements so that their story remains consistent and believable. As a result, deceivers often leak important information both verbally and nonverbally.

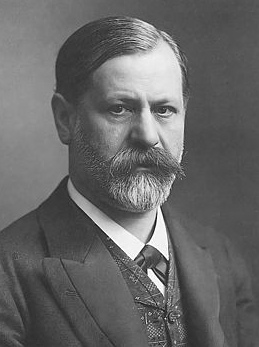
Sigmund Freud (1856–1939)

In the early twentieth century, Sigmund Freud studied nonverbal cues to detect deception about a century ago. Freud observed a patient being asked about his darkest feelings. If his mouth was shut and his fingers were trembling, he was considered to be lying. Freud also noted other nonverbal cues, such as drumming one's fingers when telling a lie. More recently, scientists have attempted to establish the differences between truthful and deceptive behavior using a myriad of psychological and physiological approaches. In 1969, Ekman and Friesen used straightforward observation methods to determine deceptive non-verbal leakage cues, while more recently Rosenfeldet et al. used magnetic resonance imaging (MRI) to detect differences between honest and deceptive responses.

In 1989, DePaulo and Kirkendol developed the Motivation Impairment Effect (MIE). MIE states the harder people try to deceive others, the more likely they are to get caught. Burgoon and Floyd, however, revisited this research and formed the idea that deceivers are more active in their attempt to deceive than most would anticipate or expect.

IDT was developed in 1996 by David B. Buller and Judee K. Burgoon. Prior to their study, deception had not been fully considered as a communication activity. Previous work had focused upon the formulation of principles of deception. These principles were derived by evaluating the lie detection ability of individuals observing unidirectional communication. These early studies found initially that "although humans are far from infallible in their efforts to diagnose lies, they are substantially better at the task than would result merely by chance." Additionally, research has shown that deception and suspected deception occurs in at least one quarter of all conversations.

Buller and Burgoon discount the value of highly controlled studies – usually one-way communication experiments – designed to isolate unmistakable cues that people are lying. Therefore, IDT is based on two-way communication and intended to describe deception as an interaction communicative process. In other words, deception is an interpersonal communication method that required the active participation of both the deceiver and receiver. Buller and Burgoon wanted to emphasize that both the receiver and deceiver are active participants in the deception process. Both are constantly engaged in conscious and unconscious behaviors that relay their true intentions. Buller and Burgoon initially based their theory of IPD on the four-factor model of deception developed by social psychologist Miron Zuckerman, who argues that the four components of deceit inevitably cause cognitive overload and therefore leakage. Zuckerman's four factors include the attempt to control information, which fosters behavior that can come across as too practiced, followed by physiological arousal as a result of deception. This arousal then leads to the third factor, felt emotions, which are usually guilt and anxiety, which can become noticeable to an observer. Additionally, the many cognitive factors and mental gymnastics that are going on during a deception often lead to nonverbal leakage cues, such as increased blinking and a higher pitched voice.

== Propositions ==
IDT's model of interpersonal deception has 21 verifiable propositions. Based on assumptions of interpersonal communication and deception, each proposition can generate a testable hypothesis. Although some propositions originated in IDT, many are derived from earlier research. The propositions attempt to explain the cognition and behavior of sender and receiver during the process of deception, from before interaction through interaction to the outcome after interaction.

=== Context and relationship ===
IDT's explanations of interpersonal deception depend on the situation in which interaction occurs and the relationship between sender and receiver.

1. Sender and receiver cognition and behaviors vary, since deceptive communication contexts vary in access to social cues, immediacy, relationship, conversational demands and spontaneity.
2. In deceptive interchanges, sender and receiver cognition and behaviors vary; relationships vary in familiarity (informational and behavioral) and valence.

=== Other factors before interaction ===
Individuals approach deceptive exchanges with factors such as expectancy, knowledge, goals or intentions and behaviors reflecting their communication competence. IDT posits that these factors influence the deceptive exchange.

3. Compared with truth-tellers, deceivers engage in more strategic activity designed to manage information, behavior and image and have more nonstrategic arousal cues, negative and muted affect and non-involvement.

=== Effects on sender's deception and fear of detection ===
IDT posits that factors before the interaction influence the sender's deception and fear of detection.

4. Context moderates deception; increased interaction produces greater strategic activity (information, behavior and image management) and reduced nonstrategic activity (arousal or muted affect) over time.
5. Initial expectations of honesty are related to the degree of interactivity and the relationship between sender and receiver.
6. Deceivers' fear of detection and associated strategic activity are inversely related to expectations of honesty, a function of context and relationship quality.
7. Goals and motivation influence behavior.
8. As receivers' informational, behavioral and relational familiarity increase, deceivers have a greater fear of detection and exhibit more strategic information, behavior and image management and nonstrategic leakage behavior.
9. Skilled senders convey a truthful demeanor, with more strategic behavior and less nonstrategic leakage, better than unskilled ones.

=== Effects on receiver cognition ===
IDT also posits that factors before the interaction, combined with initial behavior, affect receiver suspicion and detection accuracy.

10. Receiver judgment of sender credibility is related to receiver truth biases, context interactivity, sender encoding skills and sender deviation from expected patterns.
11. Detection accuracy is related to receiver truth biases, context interactivity, sender encoding skills, informational and behavioral familiarity, receiver decoding skills and sender deviation from expected patterns.

=== Interaction patterns ===
IDT describes receiver suspicion and sender reaction.

12. Receiver suspicion is displayed in a combination of strategic and nonstrategic behavior.
13. Senders perceive suspicion.
14. Suspicion, perceived or actual, increases senders' strategic and nonstrategic behavior.
15. Deception and suspicion displays change over time.
16. Reciprocity is the predominant interaction pattern between senders and receivers during interpersonal deception.

=== Outcomes ===
IDT posits that interaction between sender and receiver influences how credible the receiver thinks the sender is and how suspicious the sender thinks the receiver is.

17. Receiver detection accuracy, bias, and judgments of sender credibility after an interaction are functions of receiver cognition (suspicion and truth bias), receiver decoding skill and final sender behavior.
18. Sender perceived deception success is a function of final sender cognition (perceived suspicion) and receiver behavior.

== Strategic and Non Strategic Linguistic Behavior ==
Strategic linguistic behavior: Information and image management is most relevant to language use during deception; there are three sub-strategies that can be used for this:

1. Reticence (reserving or restraining)
  - Reticence is a very common way of creating deception; it is withholding truthful information, and/or reducing the amount of specificity in content details.
2. Vagueness and Uncertainty
  - The message becomes evasive and ambiguous through language choices.
3. Non-Immediacy
  - Reduces the degree of directness and intensity of the interaction between the communicator and the object or the event communicated about. This has the effect of distancing senders from their messages.

== Receiver's role ==
Although most people believe they can spot deception, IDT posits that they cannot. A deceiver must manage his or her verbal and nonverbal cues to ensure that what they are saying appears true. According to IDT, the more socially aware a receiver is, the better he or she is at detecting deceit. A key assumption of IDT which is different from other models of deception assumes that the receiver is active in and co-regulates the deceptive encounter. This is opposed to previous research on deception that has referred to receivers as being passive in the process."

Humans have a predisposition to believe what they are told. This is referred to as a "truth bias." In a common social agreement, people are honest with one another and believe that others will be honest with them. If a deceiver begins a deceptive exchange with an accurate statement, the statement may induce the receiver to believe the rest of the deceiver's story is also true. The sender prepares the receiver to accept his or her information as truth, even if some (or all) of the dialogue is false. If the sender repeats the same tactic, the receiver will become more aware that the sender is lying.

When suspicion is aroused in the receiver, there are a variety of ways that this suspicion can be expressed. Buller and Burgoon (1996) emphasized that there is no uniform receiver style to express suspicion, but instead is expressed through a variety of ways that they had discovered in previous research. According to Buller et al. (1991), receivers often utilize follow-up questions to question their deceivers if they begin to detect deception. Buller et al. found that this did not elicit as much suspicion as probes from nonsuspicious receivers. Burgoon et al. (1995) found that some receivers engaged in a more dominant interview style to engage with their deceiver, which represents a more aggressive and "unpleasant" style of questioning that aroused suspicion on the part of the deceiver.

== Emotion ==
Emotion plays a central role in IDT as a motivation and result of deception. Emotion can motivate deception, with the sender relying on relevant knowledge (informational, relational and behavioral familiarity) to achieve goals such as self-gratification, avoiding a negative emotional outcome or creating a negative emotional outcome for the target of deception. Emotion can be a result of deception, since a physical response occurs in the sender (usually arousal and negative affect).

=== Leakage ===
The concept of leakage predates the development of IDT and was developed by Miron Zuckerman, et al., who created a four-factor model to explain when and why leakage is apt to occur. Leakage in deception is manifested most overtly in nonverbal signals; studies indicate that over 90 percent of emotional meaning is communicated non-verbally. Humans are sensitive to body signals, and communication is often ambiguous; something is communicated verbally and its opposite non-verbally. Leakage occurs when nonverbal signals betray the true content of a contradictory verbal message. Facial expression is difficult to read, and the Facial Action Coding System (FACS) is a means of uncovering deception. Small facial movements, known as micro-expressions, can be detected in this system using action units.

=== Micro-expressions and action units ===
Action units (AUs) can be examined frame by frame, since these micro-expressions are often rapid. Paul Ekman’s research in facial deception has found several constants in certain expressions, with the action units relating to lip-corner pulling (AU12) and cheek-raising (AU6) qualifiers for happiness in most people. Brow-lowering (AU4) and lip-stretching (AU20) are disqualifiers for happiness. According to Ekman, emotional leakage appears in these fleeting expressions.

Ekman's research has received much attention in the popular media, but it also has been heavily criticized on both experimental and theoretical grounds. His theory that micro-expressions are effective markers for detecting deception is no longer considered to be well-supported. One criticism is that the theory "confounds emotion and deception", like use of the polygraph in assuming that an innocent person and a guilty one will feel different emotions in a situation which has severe possible outcomes. Concerns with such emotionally-based theories have led later researchers to develop theories based on cognition and cognitive processes.

==== Facial expression ====
Seven basic emotions are communicated through facial expression: anger, fear, sadness, joy, disgust, surprise and contempt. These emotions are recognized universally. These expressions are innate or develop through socialization.

Cultures have a variety of rules governing the social use of facial expression; for example, the Japanese discourage the display of negative emotions. Individuals may find it difficult to control facial expression, and the face may "leak" information about how they feel.

==== Gaze ====
People use eye contact to indicate threat, intimacy and interest. Eye contact is used to regulate turn-taking in conversation, and indicates how interested the listener (receiver) is in what the speaker is saying. Receivers make eye contact about 70–75 percent of the time, with each contact averaging 7.8 seconds.

==== Gesture ====
Gestures are among the most culture-specific forms of nonverbal communication, and may lead to misinterpretation. Involuntary self-touching, such as touching the face, scratching, gripping the hands together or putting the hands in (or near) the mouth, occur when people experience intense emotions such as depression, elation or extreme anxiety.

Ekman and Friesen demonstrated gesture leakage by showing films of a depressed woman to a group, which was asked to judge the woman's mood. Those shown only the woman's face thought she was happy and cheerful, while the group who saw only her body thought she was tense and disturbed.

==== Touch ====
Touch can reassure and indicate understanding. Humans touch one another in sexual intimacy, affiliation and understanding; in greetings and farewells; as an act of aggression, and to demonstrate dominance. According to Argyle in 1996, there "appear to be definite rules which permit certain kinds of touch, between certain people, on certain occasions only. Bodily contact outside these narrow limits is unacceptable".

== Criticism ==
DePaulo, Ansfield and Bell questioned IDT: "We cannot find the 'why' question in Buller and Burgoon's synthesis. There is no intriguing riddle or puzzle that needs to be solved, and no central explanatory mechanism is ever described". Em Griffin supported this criticism by pointing out a "good objective theory" must explain an event or human behavior which is much more significant than IDT in that it discusses "how" communication works in these scenarios, but not the "reason" why this communication theory works in these scenarios. Although they praised Buller and Burgoon's 18 propositions as a comprehensive description of the timeline of deceptive interactions, they said the propositions lacked the interconnectedness and predictive power of a unifying theory. DePaulo et al. criticized IDT for failing to distinguish between interactive communication (which emphasizes the situational and contextual aspects of communicative exchanges) from interpersonal communication, which emphasizes exchanges in which the sender and receiver make psychological predictions about the other's behavior based on specific prior knowledge; this conceptual ambiguity limited IDT's explanatory power. However, Buller and Burgoon responded to this type of critique, saying the theory "was not meant to advance a single explanatory mechanism but instead to fit a broad communicative perspective on the phenomenon and to include multiple causal mechanisms that fit a general interpersonal communication account of the process."

Srour and Py's General Theory of Deception (GTD), published in 2022, thus provides a clearer account of the decision mechanism in deception. While they mention that Interpersonal Deception Theory does not directly contribute to GTD, they acknowledge that it helps explain how relationships and contexts impact decisions to lie. Srour and Py build on this by developing what they call the "five forces model." In this model, a person asked to tell the truth considers the possible benefits of lying, the expected punishment, the risk of being caught, the effort required to engage in deception, and the psychological dissonance it may engender. These considerations feed into a formal deception decision algorithm. In this regard, the GTD answers one significant criticism levied at Interpersonal Deception Theory: instead of explaining conditions that surround deception, GTD proposes a testable model of how the decision is made. Deception is modeled as a goal-directed choice where individuals weigh expected costs against benefits of each potential answering option, to determine whether or not to lie.

Park and Levine provide additional commentary questioning IDT stating that "because both interactive and noninteractive experiments lead to the same conclusions about truth-bias and accuracy regardless of interactivity, interactivity is not the all-important consideration as IDT claims." In IDT, a crucial emphasis is placed in the aspect of interactivity to determine deception detection accuracy. However, Park and Levine do not see an empirical basis for this foundational claim of IDT.

== Experiment ==
Buller and Burgoon asked participants to put themselves in the following situation: "You've been dating Pat for nearly three years and feel quite close in your relationship. Since Pat goes to a different school upstate, the two of you have agreed to date other people. Nevertheless, Pat is quite jealous and possessive. During the school year you see Pat only occasionally, but you call each other every Sunday and talk for over an hour. On Friday one of your friends invites you to a party on Saturday night, but the party is 'couples only' so you need a date. There's no way that Pat could come down for the weekend. You decide to ask someone from your class who you've been attracted to so that you can go to the party. The two of you go and have a great time. On Sunday afternoon, there's a knock on your door and it's Pat. Pat walks in and says, 'Decided to come down and surprise you, tried calling you all last night, but you weren't around. What were you doing?'". The researchers listed three possible responses: lying ("I was at the library getting ready for my theory exam"), telling part of the truth while omitting important details ("Went to a party at a friend's apartment") or being intentionally vague or evasive ("Went out for a while")". These three responses were categorized as falsification,concealment, and equivocation. These three differ, respectively, in that one creates a fiction, hides a secret, and the last dodges the issue; all falling under the umbrella of deception as defined by Buller and Burgoon.

== Online dating ==
Research on the use of deception in online dating has shown that people are generally truthful about themselves with the exception of physical attributes to appear more attractive. Most online deception is subtle with slight exaggerations, representing people's attempts to portray themselves in the best possible light. Of all online contexts, online dating appears the most prone to deception. In general, no matter the setting, people are more likely to be deceptive when looking for a date than in other social situations.

Research suggests that while slight misrepresentations on online dating sites are quite common, major deceptions are actually rare. It seems that those who engage in online dating realize that while they want to make the best possible impression, if they want to pursue an offline relationship, they can't begin it with outright falsehoods that will quickly be revealed. One survey of over 5,000 users of online dating sites how likely they were to misrepresent themselves in areas such as appearance and job information. The average rating on these items was a 2 on a 10-point scale, indicating a relatively low level of deception overall.

Some people are more prone to deceptive behavior online than others, such as those with high sensation-seeking tendencies, and those who show addictive behavior toward the Internet. Conversely, those who are introverted or have high tendencies for social anxiety are especially likely to be honest about their personalities online, revealing hidden aspects of the self that they would not normally show to others offline.

According to the Scientific American, "nine out of ten online daters will fib about their height, weight, or age" such that men were more likely to lie about height while women were more likely to lie about weight. In addition, those high in the trait of self-monitoring are more likely to be dishonest on dating websites. In all aspects of their social lives, self-monitors are concerned with outward appearance and adapt their behavior to match the social situation. Thus, they also tend to be more deceptive in their attempts to attract dates both offline and online.

In a study conducted by Toma and Hancock, "less attractive people were found to be more likely to have chosen a profile picture in which they were significantly more attractive than they were in everyday life." Both genders used this strategy in online dating profiles, but women more so than men. Additionally, the researchers found that those deemed less attractive were more likely to express deception in the areas of physical attractiveness such as height and weight.

A qualitative study investigated deception in online dating. The study focused on four questions: (1) About what characteristics are online daters deceptive? (2) What motivation do online daters have for their deception of others in the online-dating environment? (3) What perceptions do online daters have about other daters' deceit towards them in the online-dating environment? (4) How does deception affect romantic relationships formed in the online-dating environment? In an online survey, data was collected from 15 open-ended questions. The study had 52 participants, ranging in age from 21 to 37, and found that most online daters consider themselves (and others) mostly honest in their online self-presentation. Online daters who used deception were motivated to do so by the desire to attract partners and project a positive self-image. Daters were willing to overlook deception in others if they viewed the dishonesty as a slight exaggeration or a characteristic of little value to the dater. Despite deception, participants believe that the online-dating environment can develop successful romantic relationships.

== See also ==
- Affect display
- Language expectancy theory
- Tell (poker)
- Manipulation (psychology)
