= Motivation impairment effect =

Hypothesised behavioural effect

Motivation impairment effect (MIE) is a hypothesised behavioral effect relating to the communication of deception. The MIE posits that people who are highly motivated to deceive are less successful in their goal (compared to those who are less motivated) when their speech and mannerisms are observed by the intended audience. This is because their nonverbal cues, such as adaptor gestures, sweating, kinesic behaviors, verbal disfluencies, etc., tend to be more pronounced due to increased stress, cognitive load, and heightened emotional state. There is some disagreement regarding the MIE hypothesis, with a few nonverbal communication scholars arguing that deception should not be examined as separate for senders and receivers, but rather as an integral part of the overall process.

== Hypothesis ==
The MIE hypothesis associated with deceptive communication predicts that relative to those who are less motivated, those who are more highly motivated to get away with their deception may be better at the verbal aspects of their deception, but comparatively less successful when others can observe their nonverbal behaviors. Thus, lies told by motivated liars should be more readily detected than lies told by unmotivated liars, as Iong as the judges of the lie can see or hear the speakers' nonverbal and verbal cues. Therefore, a negative association is predicted between motivation and deception performance, but only when the observer has direct access to the deceiver's nonverbal cues.

When only verbal channels are accessible, predictions are that performance is improved by motivation. The motivation impairment effect is founded on basis that deception is associated with heightened mental, emotional, and cognitive responses caused by emotions of fear of being discovered, guilt, and feeling uncomfortable.

=== Alternative hypothesis ===
Interpersonal deception theory (Burgoon et al., 1995) has more recently generated research challenging DePaulo & Kirkendol's motivation impairment effect hypothesis. Offering a set of alternative predictions derived from interpersonal deception theory, Burgoon et al. suggest increased motivation can often enhance both verbal and nonverbal performance irrespective of whether individuals are telling the truth or engaging in deception. In the early stages of her work on interpersonal deception, Burgoon stated that researchers should view deception as a "chain of offensive and defensive maneuvers on the part of both participants". Deception should not be examined as separate for senders and receivers, but rather as an integral part of the overall process. The deception game isn't balanced, however. Deceivers always know the name of the game, and they usually have more to lose if they fail. With this heightened motivation, deceivers are more successful at sensing suspicion than respondents are at spotting deception.

== Non-verbal leakage ==
Non-verbal behavior is primarily automatic, reactive, and often unintentional. When communicators attempt to hide or control their arousal, they might expose themselves to nonverbal leakage, by unintentionally communicating nonverbally that they might be attempting to deceive. There can be no question that certain types of non-verbal leakage often occur outside conscious control. The more motivated a deceiver is, the harder they will try, compared to less motivated deceivers, to mask or control their behavior in order to perform the deception believably. According to the motivation impairment effect hypothesis, however, the increased arousal and behavioral control associated with such efforts actually impairs deceptive success rather than enhances it as a consequence of increased nonverbal leakage. The harder deceivers try to create convincing lies, the more likely they are to arouse suspicion and, hence, fail at their efforts.

Non-verbal leakage can be observed in similar situations that involve verbal and non-verbal cues associated with the particular emotions that a liar attempts to hide. A good example is when an individual attempts to act like they like someone. Observers may tend to assume that the person likes the other person due to the faked affect. Nevertheless, if the observers are keen to assess how the individual pretending to like the other person actually behaves when they are around people they love, one would observe significant differences. They may observe that the individuals show more liking for people they like than those they pretend to like.

When an individual has an increased desire to deceive another individual, they attempt to regulate behaviors that express their feelings. Nevertheless, they only succeed in controlling the ones that can be regulated, such as verbal cues. They may fail to control their non-verbal cues since they occur involuntarily. The more an individual attempts to conceal the truth to prevent others from discovering it, the easier it becomes to see through their lies. However, this does not only reflect performance impairment, it also may show both inhibition and improvement.

== Deception categories ==
Instrumental: To avoid punishment or to protect resources. Instrumental deception occurs commonly in court when speakers intentionally lying under oath in an attempt to have their sentencing shortened, get off a case, or get off completely free. It is deeply important to understand the non-verbal cues that come with deceptive communication so that innocent people are not wrongly convicted or so deceptive individuals can manipulate others or the law. It has been widely documented across the United States that individuals instrumentally deceiving those in court have gotten innocent people convicted, or exonerated guilty individuals. Individuals who are instrumentally motivated will experience higher levels of detection apprehensiveness when motivated by self-interest rather than goals for relationships or identity.

Relational: To maintain relationships or bonds. Relational deception occurs often in personal and professional situations, whether that be personal or professional lying or political deceit. The main goal of Relational deception is to preserve a relationship or bond with an individual through false claims or deceptive behavior.

Identity: To preserve "face" or the self-image. Oftentimes, identity-motivated individuals use deception as a show of competence or to provide prospects for success in their chosen careers. In self-presenting, individuals behave in ways that convey certain roles and personal qualities to others. In most instances, deceptive self-presenters are found less conceiving and more noticeable than truthful presentations. Secondly, these actions will come off more deliberately when their performative actions are deceitful rather than truthful.

Three main components of deception: The original deceptive message, additional messages intended to increase the believability of the central message, and unintentional behaviors that possibly give away the deception.

== Signs indicating deception ==
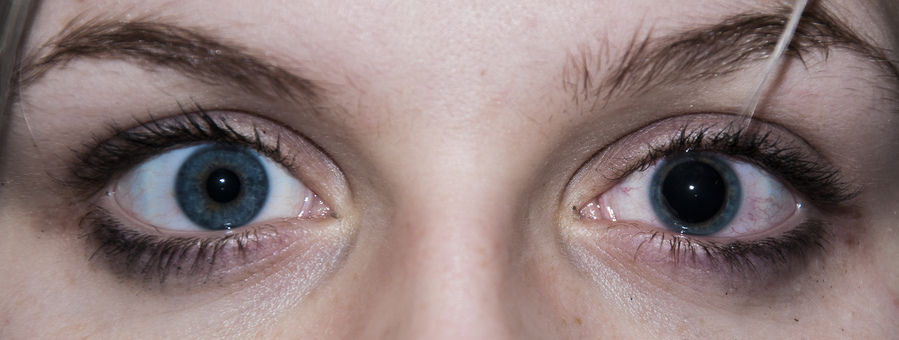
The left eye is what normal pupils look like, and the right is dilated.

Nonverbal cues are considered to be like involuntary responses, such as tongue slips which are hard to control. It may be more challenging for a liar to control their non-verbal cues when deceiving another individual. This can be attributed to various reasons, including the connection between a person's feelings and non-verbal cues, which do not exist for verbal cues.

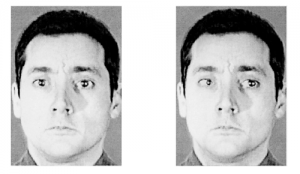
Individual avoids direct eye contact due to feelings of discomfort

- Increased, rapid, or strained blinking
- Dilation of the pupils - Pupils will shrink or enlarge depending on what is motivating the interaction.
- Gaze avoidance - Avoiding looking intently at or in admiration to an individual.
- Pitch change in voice - Voice will go higher in some instances and lower in others.
- Increased tempo or rate of speech - Individuals may speed up their rate of speech as a result of being nervous in an attempt to make up for the lack of truth.
- Hesitations more pronounced - Individuals may emphasize hesitations to portray a stronger and more valid story.
- Nonverbal and verbal inconsistencies - This could be small things such as hand movements, fidgeting, eye movement, inability to stand still, and facial movements. These all give small indicators to whether or not someone is being truthful.
- Sweating - Individuals may begin to sweat or perspire while in conversation or in acts of deception: this is due to an internal response stemming from the individual themself knowing what they are saying is untrue, while not wanting that information to be perceived as untrue.
- Fidgeting: foot-tapping, leg shaking, playing with an object, tapping one's fingers or knuckles quickly. These gestures show anxiousness or restlessness.
- Adaptor gestures: consistently touching one's face or hair could be revealing inner discomfort or attempting to hide facial cues.

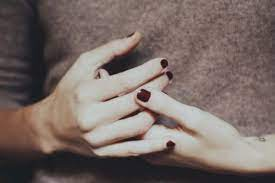
An individual attempting to deceive another may fidget with their hands due to feeling uncomfortable or nervous about their deception.

== Sex differences ==
"When speakers were talking to members of the opposite sex, their lies were--as predicted--more readily detected from channels that included nonverbal cues than when they were talking to members of the same sex, and presumably were less highly motivated to get away with their lies". "When speakers were talking to attractive listeners, and presumably were more highly motivated to succeed in their lies than when talking to unattractive listeners, they appeared to the judges to be more insincere, both when lying and telling the truth. Lies told by women were more readily detected from the channels that included visual nonverbal cues than were the lies told by men."

== Real world situations ==
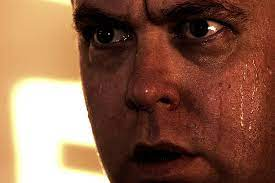
Sweating is a common response to fear or stress, which is why an individual intentionally deceiving another could notice increased physical symptoms of anxiety.

Law enforcement has had help from researchers in developing new strategies for detecting deception/lying. They look for the obvious nonverbal and verbal signs indicating deception, but that is not enough sometimes. It was found that there are "culture specific differences in tone of voice and vocal characteristics." Authorities and researchers have conducted more through interview investigations. Furthermore, if individuals who are highly motivated to deceive others may use their motivation to their advantage through channeling most of their mental energy to creating a convincing story, their heightened desire may fail due to non-verbal cues which they may not recognize and are unable to control. This is giving authorities the upper hand, they are making the interviews more complex, for example, by making them tell their stories in reverse rather than chronological. The word count and what word is being used also is analyzed. "If a liar plans what they are going to say, then they are going to have a larger quantity of words," when giving their fabricated story or testimony. Also, it is examined how someone trying to lie will use more single-syllable words and repeat certain words, as well as words that convey uncertainty; "might" rather than "will". Lie detectors also can be used to convey certainty of who is lying and who is telling the truth. In order to succeed in deception, liars are required to repress their verbal and non-verbal cues to conceal the fact that they are lying. Expert liars are individuals who appear to be truthful even when they lie. They even look sincere when they are lying and also when they are not lying. Many individuals look sincere when in fact, they are lying. People also fabricate the truth and even talk their way around a lie to lower cognitive load, thus limiting nonverbal or verbal cues that show deception. Nevertheless, if a keen observer contrasts when an individual is lying and when they are telling the truth, they can easily observe variations.

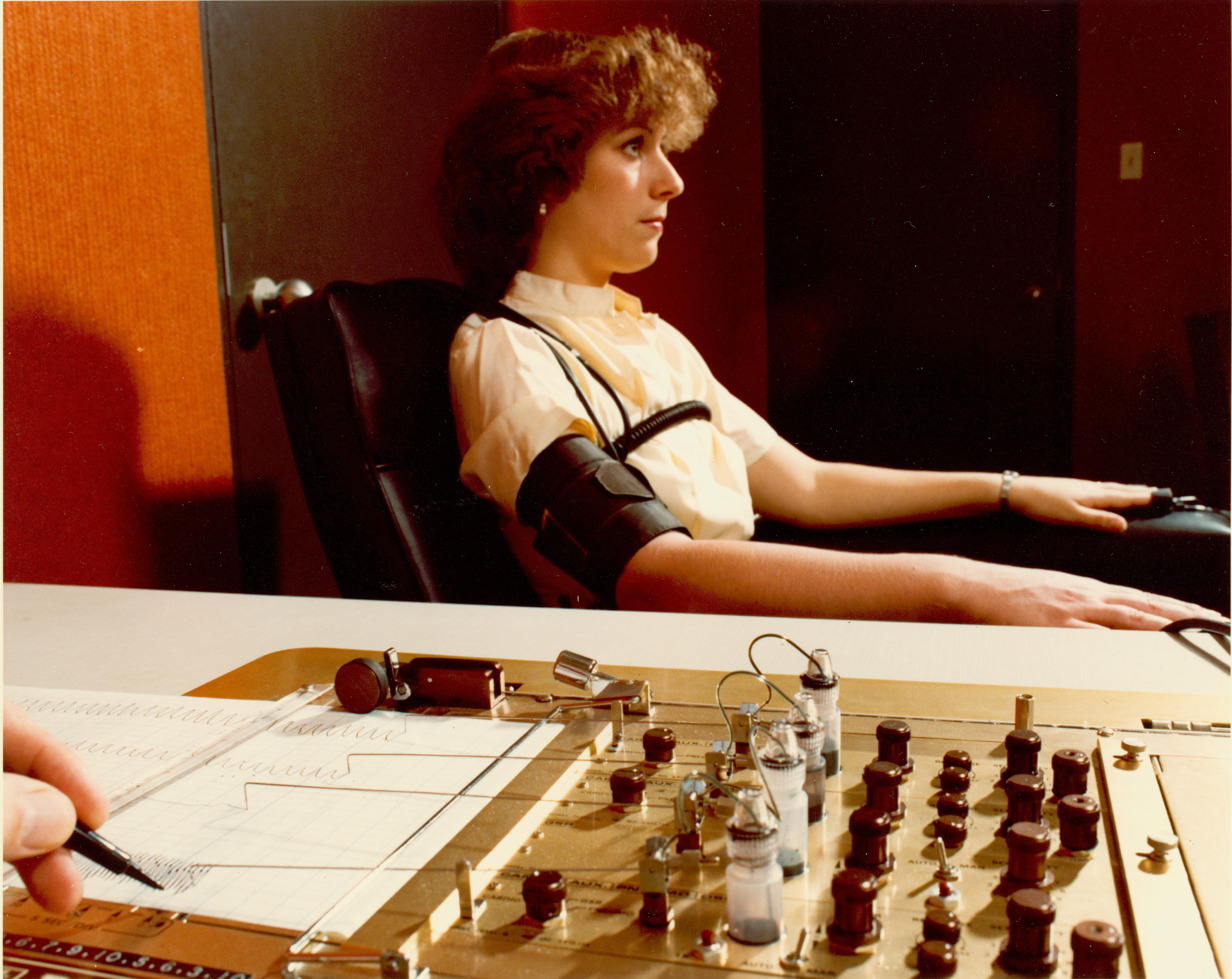
Polygraph test

Polygraph test or a lie detector test looks deeper than just the verbal and nonverbal cues that someone is lying and also talking through actions or stories to see if it matches the true story. Poly graphs look at "the body's reactions to stress such as elevated heart rate, blood pressure, faster breathing".

== Across cultures ==
Individualist: Stresses self-assertion and promotion, as well as competition. Individualistic cultures accept small lies to avoid hurt, and self-aggrandizement is an accepted part of personality. Individualists are more likely to accept lies that are self-serving. People in individualistic cultures developed different, more absolute systems of moral judgment than commonly found in collectivist cultures, which creates a different dynamics for evaluating deception.

Collectivist: Individuals will behave in ways that are expected of them by others, rather than directly for their personal benefit, creating a greater focus on upholding the social rule and avoiding disruptive conflicts, even if it means deceiving to avoid such disturbances. Collectivists tend to be more accepting of lies that support the social-good.

Zhou and Lutterbie (2005) found that, in general, Chinese rated deception as more acceptable than Americans, although the acceptance of specific types of deception depended on the culture. For example, in interacting with a stranger, American participants were more likely to accept deception to maintain secrecy and protect the self, whereas Chinese participants were more acceptable of deception aimed to benefit the other.

Another difference between cultures is the difference in deception between someone from a high-context and low-context culture. Someone from a high-context culture is going to be more "implicit communication and rely more on context".
