= Religiosity =

Degree of religious commitment or involvement

Results of a 2008/2009 Gallup poll on whether respondents said that religion was "important in [their] daily life.": 90%-100% 80%-89% 70%-79% 60%-69% / 50%-59% 40%-49% 30%-39% 20%-29% / 10%-19% 0%-9% No data

The Oxford English Dictionary defines religiosity as: "Religiousness; religious feeling or belief. [...] Affected or excessive religiousness". Different scholars have seen this concept as broadly about religious orientations and degrees of involvement or commitment. The contrast between "religious" and "religiose" (superficially religious) and the concept of "strengthening" faith suggest differences in the intensity of religiosity.

Scholars attempt to measure religiosity at the levels of individuals or groups, but differ as to what behaviors constitutes religiosity. Sociologists of religion have observed that an individual's experience, beliefs, sense of belonging, and general behavior often are not congruent with their religious behavior, since there is much diversity in how one can be religious or not. Problems arise in measuring religiosity. For instance, measures of variables such as church attendance produce different results when different methods are used, such as traditional surveys as opposed to time-use surveys.

== Components ==
The measurement of religiosity is hampered by the difficulties involved in defining what is meant by the term and what components it includes. Numerous studies have explored the different components of religiosity, with most finding some distinction between religious beliefs/doctrine, religious practice, and spirituality. When religiosity is measured, it is important to specify which aspects of religiosity are being discussed.

Numerous studies have explored the different components of human religiosity. What most have found (often using factor analysis) is that there are multiple dimensions. For instance, Marie Cornwall and colleagues identify six dimensions of religiosity based on the understanding that there are at least three components to religious behavior: knowing (cognition in the mind), feeling (effect to the spirit), and doing (behavior of the body). For each of these components of religiosity, there were two cross classifications, resulting in the six dimensions:

- Cognition
  - traditional orthodoxy
  - particularistic orthodoxy
- Affect
  - Palpable
  - Tangible
- Behavior
  - religious behavior
    - religious participation

Sociologists have differed over the exact number of components of religiosity. Charles Glock's five-dimensional approach (Glock, 1972: 39) was among the first of its kind in the field of sociology of religion. Other sociologists adapted Glock's list to include additional components (see for example, a six component measure by Mervin F. Verbit). Other researchers have found different dimensions, generally ranging from four to twelve components.

What most measures of religiosity find is that there is at least some distinction between religious doctrine, religious practice, and spirituality. Most dimensions of religiosity are correlated, meaning people who often attend church services (practice dimension) are also likely to score highly on the belief and spirituality dimensions. Nonetheless, an individual's scores on a measure of religiosity can vary between dimensions; they may not score high on all dimensions or low on all dimensions.

For example, an individual could accept truthfulness of the Bible (belief dimension), but never attend a church or even belong to an organized religion (practice dimension). Another example is an individual who did not accept orthodox Christian doctrines (belief dimension) but did attend a charismatic worship service (practice dimension) in order to develop his/her sense of oneness with the divine (spirituality dimension). A different individual might disavow all doctrines associated with organized religions (belief dimension), not affiliate with an organized religion or attend religious services (practice dimension), and at the same time be strongly committed to a higher power and feel that the connection with that higher power is ultimately relevant (spirituality dimension). These are explanatory examples of the broadest dimensions of religiosity and may not be reflected in specific religiosity measures.

Demographic studies often show a wide diversity of religious beliefs, belonging, and practices in both religious and non-religious populations. For instance, among Americans who are not religious and not seeking religion, 68% believe in God, 12% are atheists, 17% are agnostics. Also, 18% self-identify as religious, 37% self-identify as spiritual but not religious, and 42% self-identify as neither spiritual nor religious. Furthermore, 21% pray every day and 24% pray once a month. Global studies on religion also show diversity.

Decades of anthropological, sociological, and psychological research have established that the common assumption of "religious congruence" is rarely accurate. "Religious congruence" is the view that religious beliefs and values are tightly integrated in an individual's mind, or that religious practices and behaviors follow directly from religious beliefs, or that religious beliefs are chronologically linear and stable across different contexts. People's religious ideas are fragmented, loosely connected, and context-dependent, like their ideas in all other domains of culture and life. The beliefs, affiliations, and behaviors of any individual are complex activities that have many sources including culture. Mark Chaves gives the following examples of religious incongruence: "Observant Jews may not believe what they say in their Sabbath prayers. Christian ministers may not believe in God. And people who regularly dance for rain don't do it in the dry season."

== Difficulties in measurement ==
=== Polls and surveys ===
Decades of anthropological, sociological, and psychological research have shown that congruence between an individual's beliefs, attitudes, and behavior concerning religion and irreligion is rare.

The reliability of any poll results, in general and specifically on religion, can be questioned due numerous factors such as:

- there have been very low response rates for polls since the 1990s
- polls consistently fail to predict government election outcomes, which signifies that polls in general do not capture the actual views of the population
- biases in wording or topic affect how people respond to polls
- polls categorize people based on limited choices
- polls often generalize broadly
- polls have shallow or superficial choices, which complicate expressing people's complex religious beliefs and practices
- interviewer and respondent fatigue is very common

Researchers also note that an estimated 20–40% of the population changes their self-reported religious affiliation/identity over time due to numerous factors and that usually it is their answers on surveys that change, not necessarily their religious practices or beliefs.

In general, polling numbers are difficult to interpret and should not be taken at face value, since people in different cultural contexts may interpret the same questions differently.

Responses to Gallup polls on religiosity vary based on how the question is worded. Since the early 2000s, Gallup has routinely asked about complex topics like belief in God using three different question wordings and they have consistently received three different percentages in the responses.

==== In the United States ====
Two major surveys in the United States, the General Social Survey (GSS) and the Cooperative Congressional Election Study (CCES), have consistently produced discrepancies between their demographic estimates on religion that amount to 8% and growing. This is due to a few factors, such as differences in question wording that impact participant responses due to "social desirability bias"; the lumping of very different groups (atheist, agnostics, nothing in particular) into singular categories (e.g., "no religion" vs "nothing in particular"); and differences in the representativeness of the samples (e.g., "nones" are more politically moderate in the GSS sample than in the CCES sample, while Protestants are more conservative in the CCES sample than in the GSS sample).

The 2008 American Religious Identification Survey (ARIS) found a difference between how people identify and what people believe. While only 0.7% of U.S. adults identified as atheist, 2.3% said there is no such thing as a god. Only 0.9% identified as agnostic, but 10.0% said there is either no way to know if a god exists or they weren't sure. Another 12.1% said there is a higher power but no personal god. In total, only 15.0% identified as Nones or No Religion, but 24.4% did not believe in the traditional concept of a personal god. The conductors of the study concluded, "The historic reluctance of Americans to self-identify in this manner or use these terms seems to have diminished. Nevertheless ... the level of under-reporting of these theological labels is still significant ... many millions do not subscribe fully to the theology of the groups with which they identify."

According to a Pew Research Center study in 2009, only 5% of the total US population did not have a belief in a god. Out of all those without a belief in a god, only 24% self-identified as "atheist", while 15% self-identified as "agnostic", 35% self-identified as "nothing in particular", and 24% identified with a religious tradition.

Gallup's editor-in-chief, Frank Newport, argues that numbers on surveys may give an incomplete picture. In his view, declines in religious affiliation or belief in God on surveys may not actually reflect real declines, but instead increased honesty to interviewers on spiritual matters due to viewpoints previously seen as deviant becoming more socially acceptable.

=== Censuses ===
Questions of religion are "marginal" in censuses, usually optional, and are left out of most censuses in most countries. Despite attempts to standardize wording, census phrasing of the religion question have not been consistent over time or from country to country, with responders understanding them in 3 different ways. Censuses aim to enumerate religious communities, not religious faith, and "as long as the censuses in more than half of the world do not ask about religion it will not be possible to tell even within the closest million the size of the different religious communities globally."

Due to the complexity of measuring religious identity, censuses sometimes also overestimate groups; this was the case for Christians in Britain, as typically one person fills out the census one behalf of a household, as distinguished from surveys which ask individual adults.

In the Czech Republic, one of the most secular countries in the world, religious affiliation is optional in the census and in 2011 almost half the population (44%) did not answer the question; obscuring the actual number of religious and nonreligious people in the country.

== Causes and correlates ==
=== Genes and environment ===
National welfare spending vs church attendance in Christian societies

The contributions of genes and environment to religiosity have been quantified in studies of twins and sociological studies of welfare, availability, and legal regulations (state religions, etc.).

Koenig and colleagues reported in a 2005 research paper that between adolescence and adulthood, the contribution of genes to variation in religiosity (called heritability) increases from 12% to 44% and the contribution of shared (family) effects decreases from 56% to 18%.

A market-based theory of religious choice and governmental regulation of religion have been the dominant theories used to explain variations of religiosity between societies. However, researchers Anthony Gill and Eric Lundsgaarde documented a much stronger correlation between welfare state spending and religiosity (see diagram).

=== Just-world fallacy ===
Studies have found belief in a just world to be correlated with aspects of religiosity.

=== Risk-aversion ===
Several studies have discovered a positive correlation between the degree of religiousness and risk aversion.

=== Criminality ===
A few studies have found a negative correlation between religiosity and criminality. A 2001 meta-analysis found, "religious beliefs and behaviors exert a moderate deterrent effect on individuals' criminal behavior", but that "studies have systematically varied in their estimation of the religion-on-crime effect due to differences in both their conceptual and methodological approaches". This suggests that religiosity has been operationalized in varying ways, impacting the results of the findings. Additionally, 1995 paper stated that "[a]lthough a few researchers have found that religion's influence is noncontingent, most have found support—especially among youths—for effects that vary by denomination, type of offense, and social and/or religious context," suggesting a complex relationship between religiosity and crime. They also "found that, among our religiosity measures, participation in religious activities was a persistent and noncontingent inhibiter of adult crime" when controlling for other factors, such as social ecology and secular constraints.

An individual with high religious saliency (i.e. expressing the high importance of religion in their life) is less likely to be associated with criminal activities; similarly, an individual who regularly attends religious services or is highly involved in them tends to be less involved in criminality, with the exception of property damage. Other meta-analysis research suggests that those who subscribe to more orthodox religious beliefs are less likely to engage in criminal behavior than those who do not. A 2012 study suggested that belief in hell decreases crime rates, while belief in heaven increases them, and indicated that these correlations were stronger than other correlates like national wealth or income inequality.

A 1997 study of six public high schools found no statistically significant negative correlations between religiosity and crime, or religiosity and drug use, and the only relationship between religiosity and alcohol was statistically significant. A more recent review concludes that there are insufficient data to indicate any correlation between religiosity and crime. Furthermore, any possible correlations may not apply universally to all relatively nonreligious groups, as there is some evidence self-identified atheists have had significantly lower incarceration rates than the general public in the United States. Most studies examining correlation to date do not distinguish between different types of low religiosity.

== See also ==
- Demographics of atheism
- Hyperreligiosity
- Piety
- Religion and personality
- Spiritual but not religious

=== Demographics ===
- Importance of religion by country
- Religion and happiness
- Religiosity and crime
- Religiosity and education
- Religiosity and intelligence

== Source ==
- Ellis, Lee; Beaver, Kevin M.; Wright, John (1 April 2009). Handbook of Crime Correlates. Academic Press. ISBN 978-0-12-373612-3.
