= Religion and coping with trauma =

One of the most common ways that people cope with trauma is through the comfort found in religious or spiritual practices. Psychologists of religion have performed multiple studies to measure the positive and negative effects of this coping style. Leading researchers have split religious coping into two categories: positive religious coping and negative religious coping. Individuals who use positive religious coping are likely to seek spiritual support and look for meaning in a traumatic situation. Negative religious coping (or spiritual struggles) expresses conflict, question, and doubt regarding issues of God and faith.

The effects of religious coping are measured in many different circumstances, each with different outcomes. Some common experiences where people use religious coping are fear-inflicting events such as 9/11 or the Holocaust, death and sickness, and near death experiences. Research also shows that people also use religious coping to deal with everyday stressors in addition to life-changing traumas. The underlying assumption of the ability of religion to influence the coping process lies in the hypothesis that religion is more than a defence mechanism as it was viewed by Sigmund Freud. Rather than inspiring denial, religion stimulates reinterpretations of negative events through the sacred lens.

== Styles of religious coping ==
Kenneth Pargament is the author of the book Psychology of Religion and Coping and a leading researcher in religious coping. Along with developing the "RCOPE" questionnaire to measure religious coping strategies, Pargament and his colleagues designated three basic styles of coping with stress. In Pargament's article "Religion and the Problem-Solving Process: Three Styles of Coping", he identifies the collaborative, self-directed, and deferring coping styles. The collaborative style of religious coping involves an active and internalized personal exchange with God. The deferring coping style is when individuals rely heavily on God and delegate their stress without taking personal responsibility for the situation. The self-directed style of religious coping emphasizes the free will given by God that allows for the individual to solve the problem on their own. The collaborative style of coping has been found to produce the most advantages in clinical settings.

In a meta-analysis of 49 studies reviewing religion as a coping method, several mechanisms of positive coping were identified. Several are listed below.

- religious purification/forgiveness
- religious direction/conversion
- seeking support from clergy members
- spiritual connection

In the same study, negative coping strategies were also pinpointed. Some of them are listed below.

- spiritual discontent
- punishing God reappraisal
- reappraisal of God's powers
- pleading for direct intercession

The study then identified forms of positive psychological adjustment, like those listed below.

- acceptance
- happiness
- optimism
- purpose in life

A similar list of negative psychological adjustments was compiled.

- anxiety
- burden
- negative mood
- callousness

Positive religious coping methods correlated more strongly with positive psychological adjustment than negative psychological adjustment. Similarly, negative religious coping methods correlated with negative psychological adjustment.

== Specific traumatic events ==
=== September 11 attacks ===
The September 11 attacks have been widely studied among psychologists. Research has shown that 90% of Americans coped with the stress of September 11 (2001) by "turning to religion". Sixty-two percent of a sample of undergraduate and graduate students reported praying to cope with the stress that followed the attacks. Further analysis showed that searching for spiritual meaning was associated with less anxiety and depression. Psychologists also examined the types of coping used and how they affected mental health outcomes. Research shows that people who used positive religious coping displayed greater optimism, less anxiety, and higher levels of positive emotion three months after the attacks. Individuals who used positive religious coping were found to have significantly more positive outcomes (closeness with God, relationships with family and friends) than those who used negative religious coping. American Muslims were another highly studied group after the attacks. Results in this area align with previous research, showing that positive religious coping is associated with posttraumatic growth, while negative religious coping predicted higher levels of depression and anxiety.

=== Death of a loved one ===
Individuals deal with the death of significant people in their lives in a variety of ways. One of the most common ways that Americans deal with the death of a loved one is by turning to religion. Although most psychologists would argue that religious coping leads to positive outcomes, some research identifies that coping using religious can lead to greater amounts of distress, especially in dealing with the loss of a family member due to homicide. Further research recognized that the role of attachment to God is very important in determining how successful religious coping will be. Research shows that secure attachment to God and a positive religious coping style is positively correlated with stress related growth, positive religious outcomes, and a developed sense of meaning. Anxious and avoidant attachments to God and negative religious coping styles were positively correlated with depression, traumatic distress, and separation distress. Furthermore, attachment to God was strongly more correlated to positive outcomes than attachment to others.

=== Near-death experiences ===
Near-death experiences (NDEs) provide a unique opportunity for psychologists to study the way in which people cope with their own death. NDEs generally trigger an out-of-body experience into a realm populated with spiritual beings and have the potential to shape American attitudes toward death in general. Surveys show that five percent of Americans have a NDE, which presents a limited field to study. In general, people who have NDEs report positive outcomes including reduced anxiety, increased capacity to love, and a higher sense of meaning and purpose in life. Individuals who have NDEs often fall into Pargament's category of transformative coping. In these cases, the person is transformed into a whole new way of life and way of thinking by one supernatural experience.

== Using religious coping in school and work ==
=== MindUP Initiative ===
Twelve years ago Goldie Hawn founded MindUP: a mindfulness based initiative to help students in schools deal with stress. The program has since been implemented in schools in 28 states, and has locations in Canada, China, Serbia, Australia, and Venezuela. The program invites students to participate in 15 lessons based on neuroscience. Kimberly Schonert-Reichl an employee of MindsUP and of the University of British Columbia evaluated the effectiveness of MindUP on students grades 4 through 5. Her findings are shown below:

- 82% of children reported having a more positive outlook
- 81% of children learned to make themselves happy
- 58% of children tried to help others more often

Even though MindUP has had very positive effects skeptics call it religion in disguise. They claim that the mindfulness exercises such as "belly breaths" are Buddhist practices as a different name. In some states MindUP has been removed from schools because schools are supposed to be secular and non-religious.

=== Religion as buffer in the workplace ===
A study was conducted by Dr Roxane Gervais, a senior psychologist at the Health and Safety Laboratory in Stockport. She found that people who were more actively religious were more likely to report low levels of anxiety, depression and fatigue and also felt a higher presence of meaning in life. These people also took less sick days. She concluded that employers should accommodate time for employees to engage in religious beliefs while at work in order to improve performance.

== Religious coping in clinical settings ==
Despite the problems encountered when studying religion as a coping mechanism, much research suggests that using it in intervention settings when applicable may be beneficial. For example, according to a study be Wachholtz and Pargament, when identified religious people suffering from splitting migraines were exposed to meditations with religious or non-religious content, they reported less pain after the religious meditations. Such "psychospiritual" methods have been utilized for a while, although their applications are limited and specific from person to person.

== Religion vs. spirituality ==
Research in the psychology of religion often reveals different outcomes between religion and spirituality. A person's religion is a collection of belief systems and moral values, often established by a governing institution. Religion is generally more traditional, organized, and sociological. Religion is considered to be more formal and upheld than spirituality. Spirituality, on the other hand, is a measure of one's intrinsic relationship with their God. Spirituality is viewed and studied as being more free-formed and psychological. Also, spirituality is considered to be a private experience that promotes a process of growing. In the psychology of coping with trauma, religion and spirituality can play very different roles. Some research shows that religion, but not spirituality can help with coping, whereas other shows that intrinsic spirituality can be a very effective style of coping. The differences found between religious and spiritual coping may be further evidence of the role of attachment styles and types of coping used. Through religious and spiritual coping, individuals can derive support from a divine being, from other members of a religious congregation, and from making meaning of distressing events, which can lead to the promotion of resilience, healing, and well-being.

== Problems with studying religious coping ==
Studying religion as a coping mechanism has proved a difficult task for psychologists. Religion seems to be an integral part of some people's lives but not of others, so specialists cannot be certain whether religion is the variable to study or if there is something about religious people that makes them religious that is worth studying. Many studies only measure the frequency of certain "religious" activities including prayer or religious service attendance; however, just because a person exhibits religious behavior does not mean that he or she uses his or her religion to cope or even adheres to the set of beliefs that constitutes a religion.

Much of the research done on religion and coping has been isolated to Christianity. Studies are being conducted to accommodate for the diversity of religions and their differences among cultures.

Many studies on the subject show contrary results. For example, some psychologists conclude that religiosity has no positive or negative outcomes at all and others cite that any form of religious coping has ultimately negative effects. These results may be a product of the inconsistencies in the ways that religion is studied as a coping mechanism or could reflect biases of researchers toward a certain religion.

== See also ==
- Religious trauma syndrome
- Trauma theology
- Spiritual crisis
