= Religiosity and education =

Relationship between the level of religiosity and the level of education

The relationship between the level of religiosity and the level of education has been studied since the second half of the 20th century.

The parameters of the two components are diverse: the "level of religiosity" remains a concept which is difficult to differentiate scientifically, while the "level of education" is easier to compile, such as official data on this topic, because data on education is publicly accessible in many countries.

Different studies lead to contrasting conclusions regarding the relationship, depending on whether "religiosity" is measured by religious practices (attendance at places of worship, for example) or specific religious beliefs (belief in miracles, for example), with notable differences between nations. For example, one international study states that in some Western nations the intensity of beliefs decreases with education, but attendance and religious practice increase. Other studies indicate that the religious have higher education than the non-religious. Other studies find that the positive correlation with low or non religiosity and education has been reversed in the past few decades.

In terms of university professors, one study concluded that in the US, the majority of professors, even at "elite" universities, were religious.

== Studies ==
=== Global studies ===
A Pew Center study about religion and education around the world in 2016, found that Jews are the most educated religious group around in the world with an average of 13.4 years of schooling; Jews also have the highest number of post-secondary degrees per capita (61%). Based on the study data, Hindus have the lowest level of formal schooling among all major religions. 41% of the world Hindus have no formal schooling, which makes them the least educated religious group in the world. About 36% of the world Muslim population have no formal schooling, Muslims have the lowest average levels of higher education than any other major religious group, with only 8% and 10% respectively have graduate and post-graduate degrees.

Christians ranked as the second most educated religious group around in the world with an average of 9.3 years of schooling. Christians were found to have the second highest number of graduate and post-graduate degrees per capita while in absolute numbers ranked in the first place (220 million). According to the study, Christians in North America, Europe, Middle East, North Africa and Asia-Pacific regions are highly educated since many of the world universities were built by the historic Christian churches, in addition to the historical evidence that "Christian monks built libraries and, in the days before printing presses, preserved important earlier writings produced in Latin, Greek and Arabic". According to the same study, Christians have a significant amount of gender equality in educational attainment, and the study suggests that one of the reasons is the encouragement of the Protestant Reformers in promoting the education of women, which led to the eradication of illiteracy among females in Protestant communities.

The religiously unaffiliated—which includes atheists, agnostics and those who describe their religion as "nothing in particular"—ranked as the third most educated religious group with an average of 8.8 years of schooling, and around 16% of unaffiliated have graduate and post-graduate degrees.

Buddhists have an average of 7.9 years of schooling, and around 12% of Buddhists have graduate and post-graduate degrees. According to the same study "there is a large and pervasive gap in educational attainment between Muslims and Christians in sub-Saharan Africa" as Muslim adults in this region are far less educated than their Christian counterparts, with scholars suggesting that this gap is due to the educational facilities that were created by Christian missionaries during the colonial era for fellow believers.

According to a 2015 global survey by Gallup International, the most religious had lower levels of education, however, religious people in general were a majority in all educational levels.

An EU survey finds a positive correlation between leaving school early and believing in a God.

In one analysis of World Values Survey data by Edward Glaeser and Bruce Sacerdote noted that in 65 former socialist countries there is a negative relationship between years of education and belief in God, with similar negative correlations for other religious beliefs while, in contrast, there were strong positive correlations between years of education and belief in God in many developed countries such as England, France and the US. They concluded that "these cross-country differences in the education-belief relationship can be explained by political factors (such as communism) which lead some countries to use state controlled education to discredit religion". The study also concludes that, in the United States and other developed nations, "education raises religious attendance at individual level," while "at the same time, there is a strong negative connection between attendance and education across religious groups within the U.S. and elsewhere." The authors suggest that "this puzzle is explained if education both increases the returns to social connection and reduces the extent of religious belief," causing more educated individuals to sort into less fervent denominations.

Statistical analysis of Nobel prizes awarded between 1901 and 2000 reveals that 65.4% of Nobel laureates were Christians, over 20% were Jewish, and 10.5% were atheists, agnostics, or freethinkers. According to a study that was done by University of Nebraska–Lincoln in 1998, 60% of Nobel prize laureates in physics from 1901 to 1990 had a Christian background. Since 1901–2013, 22% of all Nobel prizes have been awarded to Jews.

== By country ==
=== Britain ===
Research in nonreligion in Britain has shown that the positive relationship between education and non-religion has been reversed with generations after 1955. In other words, the nonreligious populations tend to have less education and religious populations tend to have higher education, even though religious affiliation has decreased for both.

=== India ===
A survey conducted by the Times of India revealed that 22% of IIT Bombay graduates do not believe in the existence of God, while another 30% do not know.

=== Ireland ===
A 2012 study suggested that in Ireland, the non-religious have a greater level of education than the religious.

=== United States ===
According to the General Social Survey, which has collected data on Americans since 1972, people who are educated often are more religious by various measures. For instance, as of 2010 sociologist Philip Schwadel found that, with each additional year of education, the likelihood of attending religious services increased 15%, the likelihood of reading the Bible at least occasionally increased by 9%. The likelihood of switching to a mainline Protestant denomination increased by 13%. Schwadel said, "With more years of education, you aren’t relatively more likely to say, ‘I don’t believe in God. But you are relatively more likely to say, ‘I believe in a higher power.’"

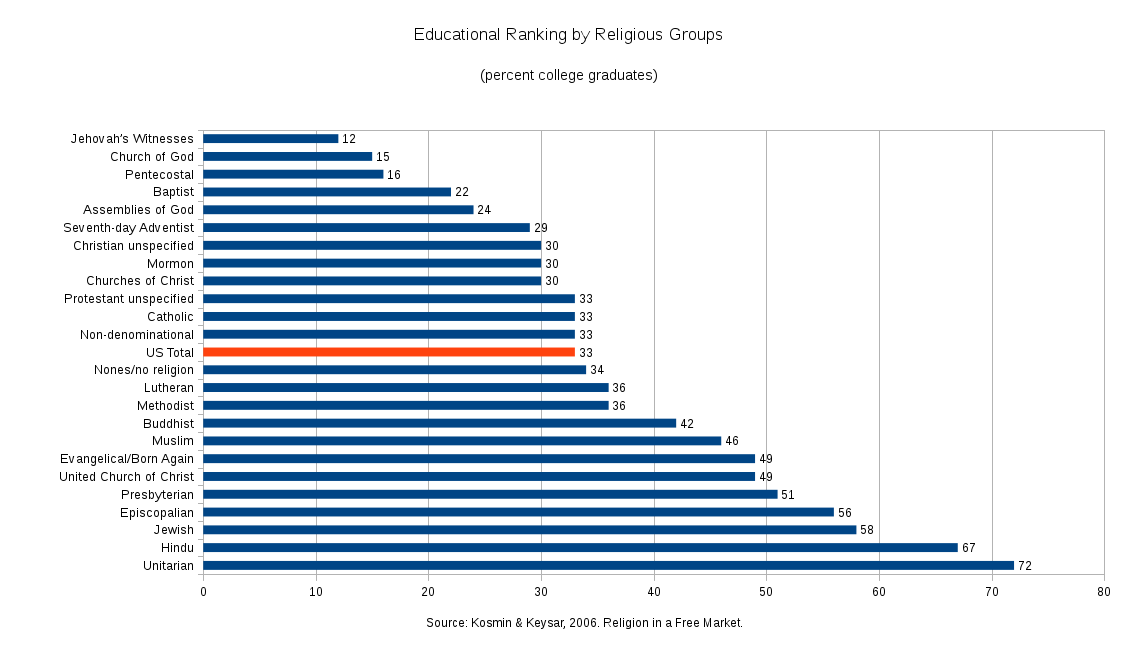
Differences in educational attainment by religious groups in the U.S., 2001 ARIS data

Sociologist Bradley Wright reviewed results from the 2008 Pew US Religious Landscape Survey and noted that religious groups normally have significant levels of education compared to those who are non-religious. "The irony" he states "is that some of the religiously unaffiliated explain their rejection of religion in terms of superior learning, but several religious groups have much higher levels of education."

He found that Hindus, Jews, Episcopalians, Presbyterians, Buddhists, and Orthodox Christians have the highest levels of education. Catholics, Mormons, and Muslims are at about the national average. Jehovah's Witnesses have by far the lowest education. Evangelicals are somewhat below the national average. The religiously unaffiliated are just slightly above average in levels of college education. Sociological research by Patricia Snell and Christian Smith on many dimensions of general American youth have noted that older research on baby boomers showed correlations where higher education undermined religiosity, however, studies on today's youth have consistently shown that this has disappeared and now students in college are more likely religious than people who do not go to college.

According to the Gallup's 2002 Index of Leading Religious Indicators for the US, the relationship between education and religiosity are complex. For instance, there are slight differences in belief in God and membership in a congregation: 88% of those with postgraduate degrees believe in God or a universal spirit, compared to 97% of those with a high school education or less; 70% of postgraduate degree holders say they are members of a congregation, compared to 64% of those with a high school education or less.

Research done by Barry Kosmin indicates that Americans with post-graduate education have a similar religious distribution and affiliation to the general population, with a higher "public religiosity" (i.e., membership in congregations and worship attendance), but slightly less "belief." Advanced education in U.S. does not seem to produce much religious skepticism since so many post-graduates are religious believers.

Research done by Barry Kosmin and Ariela Keysar on college students looked at three worldviews — Religious, Secular, and Spiritual — and looked students from levels from freshmen to post-graduates from majors such as STEM (Science, Technology, Engineering, Mathematics), Social and Behavioral Sciences, Arts and Humanities, and Undecided. The Religious were 31.8% of the total sample (40% from STEM, 27% from Social and Behavioral Sciences, 27% from Arts and Humanities, and 5% from Undecided); the Secular were 28.2% of the total sample (38% from STEM, 29% from Social and Behavioral Sciences, 30% from Arts and Humanities, and 3% from Undecided); the Spiritual were 32.4% of the total sample (29% from STEM, 36% from Social and Behavioral Sciences, 31% from Arts and Humanities, and 4% from Undecided).

Research by Neil Gross and Solon Simmons done on more than 1,400 professors from 20 disciplinary fields and religiosity found that the majority of professors, even at "elite" universities were religious believers. As a whole, university professors were less religious than the general US population, but it is hardly the case that the professorial landscape is characterized by an absence of religion. In the study, 9.8% were atheists, 13.1% were agnostic, 19.2% believe in a higher power, 4.3% believe in God some of the time, 16.6% had doubts but believed in God, 34.9% believed in God and had no doubts. At "elite" doctoral universities 36.5% were either atheists or agnostics and 20.4% believed in God without any doubts. Furthermore, the authors noted, "religious skepticism represents a minority position, even among professors teaching at elite research universities." They also found that professors at elite doctoral universities are much less religious than professors teaching in other kinds of institutions with more atheists and agnostics in numbers. However, both groups were still a minority.

A study noted positive correlations, among nonreligious Americans, between levels of education and not believing in a deity.

Frank Sulloway of the Massachusetts Institute of Technology and Michael Shermer of the California State University conducted a study that found in their polling sample of "credentialed" U.S. adults (12% had Ph.Ds and 62% were college graduates) 64% believed in God, and there was a correlation indicating that religious conviction diminished with education level.

Sociologist W. Bradford Wilcox said that people with less education have decreased in religiosity in America. Their views on family and work have been associated with this effect. Research on secularity has noted that, in America, agnostics have significant levels of education, while atheists have relatively low levels of education. Sociologist Christian Smith has done research on American evangelicals and has found that, on average, self-identified evangelicals have more years of education than fundamentalists, liberals, Roman Catholics, and the nonreligious, but slightly less than mainline Protestants. He also found that evangelicals were the least likely to have high school education or less, the nonreligious were the most likely to have high school education or less, and higher proportions of evangelicals had studied at the graduate level than fundamentalists, liberals, and the nonreligious.

Sociologist Philip Schwadel found that higher levels of education "positively affects religious participation, devotional activities, and emphasizing the importance of religion in daily life", education is not correlated with disbelief in God, and correlates with greater tolerance for atheists' public opposition to religion and greater skepticism of "exclusivist religious viewpoints and biblical literalism".

Cross-national sociological research by Norris and Inglehart notes a positive correlation between religious attendance among the more educated in the United States.

According to a Pew Center study, about 77% of American Hindus have a graduate and post-graduate degree, followed by Unitarian Universalists (67%), Jews (59%), Anglican (59%), Episcopalians (56%) and Presbyterians (47%) and United Church of Christ (46%). While according to the same study about (43%) of American atheists, and (42%) agnostics, and (24%) of those who say their religion is "nothing in particular" have a graduate and post-graduate degree.

A 2006 study by Barry Kosmin and Ariela Keysar ranked the three most college educated religious groups as Unitarian Universalists (72%), Hindus (67%), and Jews (57%).

== In specific religious denominations ==
=== American Christians ===
According to a 2017 study by the Pew Research Center, highly educated Christians in the United States are a few percentage points more likely to attend church than those with lower education levels. As a whole, Americans who have obtained college degrees attend religious services at the same rate as those who do not have them. Moreover, 75% of recent college graduates identify with an organized religion. On a scale measuring levels of religious commitment, over 70% of Christians in the United States who are educated demonstrate high levels of religiosity. Specifically, among Evangelical Christians, 87% of college graduates have high levels of religiosity as do 62% of college graduates who identify as Catholic Christians, 54% of mainline Protestants and 89% of Black Protestants. Highly educated church members of the Church of Jesus Christ of Latter-day Saints have a far greater level of religious commitment (92%) compared to those who only graduated from high school (78%).

=== Mormons ===
Studies of Mormons in the US show that Mormons with higher education attend church more regularly than less-educated Mormons. Survey research indicated that 41% of Mormons with only elementary school education attend church regularly, compared to 76% of Mormon college graduates and 78% of Mormons who went beyond their college degrees to do graduate study attending church regularly.

=== Evangelical groups ===
Edward Dutton studied findings that indicate that universities that are particularly transitional and prestigious tend to have (in contrast to less transitional universities), tightly differentiated and ‘fundamentalist’ student evangelical groups and higher levels of conversion while at university. He argued that Oxford University students are likely to be not just more intelligent in IQ terms than comparable students but more creative, more original in their thinking and more able to acquire knowledge — factors Dutton found made religious experience more likely in an individual.

In 1975, Norman Poythress studied a sample of 234 US college undergraduates, grouping them into relatively homogeneous religious types based on the similarity of their religious beliefs and compared their personality characteristics. He found that "Literally-oriented religious Believers did not differ significantly from Mythologically-oriented Believers on measures of intelligence, authoritarianism, or racial prejudice. Religious Believers as a group were found to be significantly less intelligent and more authoritarian than religious Skeptics." He used SAT scores as a measure of intelligence for this study.

=== Christian fundamentalists ===
Contrary to the researchers' expectations, fundamentalist 'converts' were not less educated people. However, a weak 'negative correlation' between education and Christian fundamentalism was found by Burton et al. (1989), a study comparing the religious beliefs and educational achievements of white, Protestant residents of Delaware County, Indiana.

== See also ==
- Religiosity and intelligence
