= Trauma theology =

Subset of Christian theology

Trauma theology is a subset of Christian theology that seeks to both make sense of traumatic experiences and reimagine the faith in light of them. It delineates between suffering and trauma, noting the latter's lasting effect on survivors. It centres the lived experiences of trauma survivors and deemphasises theodicy on pastoral grounds, rather emphasising that God remains with the trauma survivor. Much of trauma theology focuses on trauma in the Bible (such as in the crucifixion narratives and the Babylonian exile), pastoral care, doctrine, and practice (for example as it relates to the Eucharist).

== Key themes ==
=== The cross and resurrection ===
Many trauma theologians speculate that the crucifixion made Jesus a trauma survivor. Furthermore, many relate the crucifixion to their own traumatic experiences, such as Shannell T. Smith, who relates the crucifixion to her own experience of being raped. However, others doubt this, as experiencing a potentially traumatic event or series of events doesn't necessarily traumatise the victim.

=== The Eucharist ===
A significant amount of trauma theology is based around the Eucharist, as both trauma and the Eucharist share an emphasis on bodies and memories.
