= Miron Zuckerman =

American psychologist

- Born: June 6, 1945 (age 80)
- Education: Harvard University
- Known for: Social cognition Nonverbal communication
- Scientific career
- Fields: Psychology
- Institutions: University of Rochester
- Thesis: Attribution processes and anxiety over dental treatment (1973)

Miron Zuckerman (born June 6, 1945) is an American psychologist and professor of psychology at the University of Rochester. He is known for studying social cognition, nonverbal communication, and the psychology of religion.

For example, he led a 2013 meta-analysis showing a negative association between religiosity and intelligence. He told the Washington Post that these findings did not mean that only unintelligent people are religious, but that smarter people may not need religion as much, saying, "It is truly the wrong message to take from here that if I believe in God I must be stupid".

He has also researched egocentric bias, finding that people significantly overestimate their own importance in group discussions.
