= Non-verbal leakage =

Non-verbal leakage is a form of non-verbal behavior that occurs when a person verbalizes one thing, but their body language indicates another, common forms of which include facial movements and hand-to-face gestures. The term "non-verbal leakage" got its origin in literature in 1968, leading to many subsequent studies on the topic throughout the 1970s (including multiple studies by American psychologist Paul Ekman), with related studies continuing today.

Non-verbal leakage is a prominent concept in the study of body language. Others are often able to pick up any incongruity between your verbal and non-verbal messages, which can be confusing and can cause cognitive dissonance.

Even when an individual attempts to suppress his own non-verbal leakage, there are some aspects that are out of his voluntary control and will still be expressed despite efforts to the contrary. As many as 98.3% of participants in studies of deception and facial expressions have been seen to express emotional leakage in some capacity, especially when trying to conceal a high-intensity emotion.

== Types ==
In an early article on nonverbal leakage, Paul Ekman and Wallace Friesen discuss many bodily and facial movements associated with non-verbal leakage, especially in the context of deception. Ekman and Wallace focus mostly on non-verbal leakage expressed through movements of the face, hands, and feet. They describe areas like the face as parts of the body that have a high sending capacity, meaning the signals that this body part sends are easily visible and quickly received by the observer. Areas like the feet and the hands, therefore, are areas with lower sending capacities. The high sending capacity and clear visibility of the face can make non-verbal leakage obvious when it is expressed in the face, and such emotions expressed in the face are more discernible because of the complex musculature and movements of the face compared with movements of the feet or hands. It is also much easier for an individual to put his hands in his pockets, for example, than it is to hide his face and mask non-verbal facial expressions.

However, facial expressions are also some of the first expressions to be masked when one is telling a lie. People tend to be more aware of how obvious their facial expressions are, so individuals are therefore most likely to mask those expressions first. In other words, non-verbal leakage can be most obvious in the face, but because of one's awareness of his own facial expressions, the face can also produce confusing non-verbal leakage. Areas like the hands and feet are less visible in expressing emotion, but also appear to be less consciously controlled and can therefore also be indicative of an individual's true emotions or intentions.

== Individual differences ==
Some studies have found that females tend to be more responsive to non-verbal cues in comparison to verbal cues. Knowing a person's sex can also give insight into a person's non-verbal leakage, as males and females tend to display particular non-verbal leakage when telling the truth, which can also help to indicate when someone is telling a lie, as such behaviors would be suppressed. In a study in which participants rated actors' recorded verbal and non-verbal cues in a scripted video, the non-verbal cues were seen to be significantly more influential than the verbal cues in participants' assessments of the actors' performances. Dominant conversational behavior also seems to be connected to differences in non-verbal leakage; people who dominate conversations more also express unique non-verbal leakage compared to those who are less-dominant in conversation.

In relation to age, children can successfully manipulate their non-verbal expressions, even enough to deceive adults in one study. However, some other studies have found results supporting the idea that children are not as good at controlling their non-verbal expressions and leakage until they reach a certain age.

Emotional intelligence has also been found to play a role in one's detection of emotional leakage. Females and people with higher emotional intelligence tend to be better at perceiving verbal leakages. Women also tend to be higher in emotional intelligence compared to men, giving women a better ability to detect verbal leakage in comparison to men, with women performing better in tasks of facial decoding and emotional intelligence in a study of emotional intelligence of communicative expressions.

Professional dancers and actors, skilled lawyers, negotiators, and successful second-hand car salesmen have less non-verbal leakage during deception. Because of their professions, dancers and actors are trained for using their body movements to convey information to the audience. They are more aware of their body language, have more control over the movements, and are better at disguising through the non-verbal channel. The causes of negotiators and salesmen to be good non-verbal liars are more ambiguous. It might be the case that they develop skills in their careers, or they may have innate personalities that determine their career choices. It is also possible that under certain circumstances, they do not feel guilty when lying and hence leak little information. However, in one study it is suggested that lawyers do not receive enough training on conveying information to their clients using body languages, indicating that they may not gain their non-verbal deception skills from their professions.

== Detection ==
One study found that non-verbal leakage may be more easily detectable in face-to-face communications compared to when viewed in a video, although people can still detect non-verbal expressions when examining someone's communications in a video recording. In the context of face-to-face versus video-recorded communications, the authors of this study were able to examine the amount of information participants are receiving from videos of communications (with gestures and speech) versus only speech (audio recording only). People tend to gain more information when viewing communication on video with gestures and speech compared to those presented with only the audio recordings. However, this study also showed that people gain more information from speech when compared to gestures alone, although there is clearly still meaning that can be understood in gestures alone. In summary, people tend to get the most information from communicating with someone using both non-verbal gestures and speech, indicating that non-verbal leakage is an important aspect of communication and can enhance speech communication.

There may not necessarily be universal indicators of non-verbal leakage, especially those that indicate deception, because of non-verbal cue differences among demographics such as culture and age. Facial movements can be the most telling, but also the most confusing, because those are the movements that people will most actively try to mask if they are trying to hide an emotion or truth. Other parts of the body, including the legs, can also be sources of non-verbal leakage. These parts of the body are under less conscious control when communicating, so it is harder to hide non-verbal leakage in parts of the body like the hands or legs; people can more easily leak non-verbal expressions through these parts of the body. In summary, although the face is the most expressive in terms of non-verbal expression, it is also one of the most easily controlled, so its levels of non-verbal leakage can be relatively low with conscious control of facial expressions.

Indicators of facial leakage include facial expressions that last too long, that are too intensive, or that are too monotonous, lacking the natural combination of various emotions. For instance, a liar may exhibit an abnormally long-lasting smile, an extremely serious frown, or an expression of fear without any surprise. Compared with faces, hands and legs are less obvious in sending deception cues, but are also under weaker control of the deceiver. Liars may consciously control facial expression to reveal confidence and comfort, but their hands and feet can speak out fear and discomfort. Leakage in hand movements includes tearing at fingernails, poking of cheeks, defensive holding of knees, tight fists, anxious tapping of cigarettes, or snapping of a pencil. Leakage in feet and legs movements includes restless foot kicks, frequent leg shifts and squeezing, and repetitive or flirtatious leg and foot acts.

Experiments conducted by Ekman and Friesen supported the idea that body cues are more revealing of deception compared with face and head cues. Psychiatric patients engaging in deception during the medical consultation were filmed. The clips were shown to two groups of naive observers, who had not been trained for detecting deception cues. One group of observers could only see the patient's head and face, and the other group could only view the body movements below the neck. It was found that the group of observers who only saw the body cues were better at detecting patients' concealed anxiety and delusion, while the group that viewed the face cues was more misled by the patient's deception of a healthy and happy status.

A meta-analysis found that one does not need special training to be able to detect non-verbal leakage, as humans seem to have some natural ability to gain a great deal of information based on another person's non-verbal behaviors. Another study assessed human's ability to detect leakage through gaze cues in human-like robots. Groups of people participated in guessing games with near-human robots. When the robots leaked information through gaze, people performed much better in the guessing game, even though few people reported identifying the leakage cue, demonstrating that humans subconsciously pick up and respond to non-verbal leakage cues.

=== Detecting deception and emotion ===
Non-verbal leakage can be telling of deception even when one consciously attempts to control non-verbal behaviors. Multiple methods have been used in order to study behavioral differences in truthful versus deceptive language and communication, including deception detection accuracy and cue leakage. Such methods can employ processes that measure levels of arousal, as someone who is being purposefully deceptive experiences an arousal response. For example, investigators can measure pupil dilation, pitch, and errors in speech as indicators of arousal due to deceptive behaviors, because these non-verbal behaviors and physiological responses have been seen in deceptive individuals. Multiple studies have used such methods of detecting deception and non-verbal leakage, along with others involving outside raters and subjective questionnaires. One study found that there may be differences in non-verbal cues indicating deception based on the level of deception that the person is attempting, or the level of emotion that they are trying to suppress. There seem to be clear differences in the amount of cognitive control it takes to mask different types of non-verbal cues when producing deceptive information. Liars tend to have to put more effort into their responses, especially when they were not prepared to answer a question. Liars tend to pause more and take more time in preparing a response in comparison to truth-tellers, giving insight into the cognitive processing and non-verbal leakage that liars are trying to control.

Ekman suggests that deception can be detected when a person's internal feedback loop about their own non-verbal behavior has problems, causing the non-verbal behaviors that they are purposefully producing to actually give information on their deceptive processes, which can be examined through the non-verbal leakage that is exposed. Investigators have been able to pick up on some of the common verbal leakage that is expressed when someone is being deceptive. For example, people who are less dominant in conversations (those who tend to hesitate or comment less frequently in conversation compared to conversation-dominant individuals) tend to hesitate less and appear more dominant when they are telling a rehearsed lie. In one study, liars tended to smile more, whether fake or from embarrassment. Based on multiple studies and some of the proposed theories behind non-verbal leakage (below), it is clear that it does not necessarily take any training to be able to detect non-verbal leakage and to be able to pick up on another person's subtle non-verbal expressions. However, potentially because of experience in detecting lies, prisoners have been found to be exceptionally successful in detecting verbal leakage and uncovering dishonesty compared to non-prisoners.

In their studies, Wacewicz and Żywiczyński suggest that it is hard to detect deception from any single non-verbal behavior. Rather, the detection of deception relies on the understanding of deception demeanor, which includes groups of non-verbal cues. A single non-verbal behavior can be treated as a cue, and a combination of cues gives rise to inference about deception. For example, liars usually lean back and avoid to face the interrogator directly when they are talking. Turning away from the interrogator at an angle of more than 45 degrees is typically regarded as a deception cue. Other deception demeanor includes gaze aversion and unnatural body movements. Deceivers usually avoid eye contacts with the interrogator, blink more frequently and their pupils enlarge at a micro level. They also scratch, rub and pinch themselves more often to relieve fear and anxiety.

In detecting emotion, non-verbal leakage through non-verbal behaviors has more of an effect than verbal cues in indicating someone's emotional state, particularly in communicating positive or negative affect. In psychology, affect refers to the experience of feelings and emotions. Positive affect is usually transmitted through more controllable non-verbal channels such as faces, while negative affect is transmitted through less controllable channels such as hands and feet. One study found that biased teachers, who judge students stereotypically, have more dogmatic teaching practices, and are more negative toward students with low ethnic and socioeconomic status, showed more non-verbal leakage through the less controllable channels than did unbiased teachers.

=== Pain expression ===
Being able to detect pain expressed through non-verbal expression and leakage could help provide information in the clinical setting that cannot always be expressed clearly verbally or in any other manner. In one study, participants were able to accurately discriminate another person's levels of pain in electric shock scenarios based on non-verbal expression alone, so it seems as though such expressions could potentially be used to form a sensitive and accurate pain index that does not solely rely on verbal information. In a similar study involving deliverance of electric shocks and pain expression and evaluation, the author found that there are measurable, topographic changes that occur in the face when someone is experiencing pain. Such measurable responses can give insight into a person's levels of pain in a strictly non-verbal manner. Based on such results, some scientists believe that non-verbal leakage and detection may have clinical value in evaluating and treating pain, especially in the absence of verbal expression.

== Theories ==
Wacewicz and Żywiczyński tried to explain the existence of leakage cues. From an evolutionary perspective, behaviors that leak the liar's intention should be selected against and removed over time. Instead, "poker faces" should be favored by natural selection as they leak little information during deception. There are two potential explanations for this from not happening. The first explanation is that lying imposes pressure on people's cognitive system and changes their physiological state, leading to an increasing number of cues including those that are hard to suppress. The second explanation is the signal cost associated with deception.

Some scientists believe that people may express and detect non-verbal attitudes and communications because of an innate emotional understanding of such processes. In support of this innate hypothesis, in a meta-analysis of interpersonal behaviors, authors came to the conclusion that it is evolutionarily advantageous for emotional non-verbal expressions (such as non-verbal leakage) to be judged quickly, as such processes can help an individual adapt to a new environment or understand a situation.

One of the theories behind deceptive non-verbal leakage in particular is that the person lying is experiencing emotions such as guilt or shame, and those emotions associated with lying are what cause the person to exhibit non-verbal leakage that goes against the expressions that he is consciously trying to control.

In investigating why women seem to be better at detecting and interpreting non-verbal leakage, some authors have proposed that women may be more attentive to explicit emotional processes and may be more socially motivated to pay attention to subtle emotions or non-verbal communications, whereas men are more attentive to emotions based on implicit experiences.

In detecting pain through non-verbal stimuli, one study also found that non-verbal leakage can give others clues as to whether or not a person is exaggerating their pain response or not. Observers found that people who were exaggerating their pain levels tended to show more unnatural facial changes than those who were responding at a natural and appropriate level to the intensity of electric shock experienced.

=== Inhibition hypothesis ===
Charles Darwin hypothesized that humans cannot consciously control strong emotions and therefore cannot inhibit the facial muscles associated with intense emotions, thus limiting our ability to voluntary control our non-verbal facial cues associated with intense emotion. The results of multiple studies of non-verbal leakage have been seen to support Darwin's inhibition hypothesis. Studies have also found that it may be impossible to completely hide one's emotions because of the non-verbal leakage that is involuntarily expressed, especially in the face, when one is creating a falsified emotion.

In going with Darwin's inhibition hypothesis, Ekman proposed that those facial movements that cannot be voluntary controlled when one is experiencing intense emotions can be seen through micro-expressions; such expressions are almost impossible to see with the naked eye because of their usual expression time of less than half of a second.

==== Role of intensity of emotion ====
Emotional leakage has been found to be very difficult to prevent or conceal, and high-intensity emotions are much more likely to result in unintended emotional leakage compared to low-intensity emotions.

== Relationship to mental disorders ==
Non-verbal leakage has also been studied in some study participants with mental disorders, particularly those with anxiety or depression, and authors have found unique characteristics of some of the non-verbal leakage expressed in individuals with these disorders. When exposed to non-verbal cues only, study participants have been able to detect another person's anxiety, especially because of movement in the anxious person's hands, eyes, mouth, and torso. Through this process, participants were able to relatively accurately gauge the other person's anxiety levels as well. Although some non-verbal cues expressed in subjects with each disorder are very similar (such as eye contact), there also seem to be unique characteristics of the non-verbal cues associated with each disorder.

=== Anxiety ===
In participants with anxiety, non-verbal leakage tends to consist of increases in non-signaling gestures, such as tremors and twitching. Hand gestures have been found to be the most telling in non-verbal cues associated with anxiety, followed by eyes, mouth, and torso. Common observations of the hands include nervous twitching, unnatural stiffness, and clammy hands, along with other aspects such as darting eyes, increased eye movements, licking lips, irregular breathing, and a stiff upper body.

=== Depression ===
For depression, the most telling non-verbal leakage can be observed most clearly in the eyes, followed by mouth movements, head angle, and lastly hand movement. Although these movements may be similar to those seen in individuals with anxiety, the patterns of such movements seem to be unique with each disorder.
