= Religiosity and intelligence =

Link between religiosity and intelligence

The study of religiosity and intelligence explores the link between religiosity and intelligence or educational level (by country and on the individual level). Religiosity and intelligence are both complex topics that include diverse variables, and the interactions among those variables are not always well understood. For instance, intelligence is often defined differently by different researchers; also, all scores from intelligence tests are only estimates of intelligence, because one cannot achieve concrete measurements of intelligence (as one would of mass or distance) due to the concept's abstract nature. Religiosity is also complex, in that it involves wide variations of interactions of religious beliefs, practices, behaviors, and affiliations, across a diverse array of cultures.

The study on religion and intelligence has been ongoing since the 1920s and conclusions and interpretations have varied in the literature due to different measures for both religiosity and intelligence. Some studies find negative correlation between intelligence quotient (IQ) and religiosity. However, such studies and others have found the effect not to be generalizable and unable to predict religiosity from intelligence correlations alone. Some have suggested that nonconformity, cognitive style, and coping mechanism play a role while others suggest that any correlations are due to a complex range of social, gender, economic, educational and historical factors, which interact with religion and IQ in different ways. Less developed and poorer countries tend to be more religious, perhaps because religions play a more active social, moral and cultural role in those countries.

Studies on analytic thinking and nonbelievers suggest that analytical thinking does not imply better reflection on religious matters or disbelief. A cross-cultural study observed that analytic thinking was not a reliable metric to predict disbelief. A review of the literature on cognitive style found that there are no correlations between rationality and belief/disbelief and that upbringing, whether religious or not, better explains why people end up religious or not.

A global study on educational attainment found that Jews, Christians, religiously unaffiliated persons, and Buddhists have, on average, higher levels of education than the global average. Numerous factors affect both educational attainment and religiosity.

== Definitions and issues ==
=== Intelligence ===
The definitions of intelligence are controversial since at least 70 definitions have been found among diverse fields of research. Some groups of psychologists have suggested the following definitions:

From "Mainstream Science on Intelligence" (1994), an op-ed statement in the Wall Street Journal signed by fifty-two researchers (out of 131 total invited to sign).

A very general mental capability that, among other things, involves the ability to reason, plan, solve problems, think abstractly, comprehend complex ideas, learn quickly and learn from experience. It is not merely book learning, a narrow academic skill, or test-taking smarts. Rather, it reflects a broader and deeper capability for comprehending our surroundings—"catching on," "making sense" of things, or "figuring out" what to do.

From "Intelligence: Knowns and Unknowns" (1995), a report published by the Board of Scientific Affairs of the American Psychological Association:

Individuals differ from one another in their ability to understand complex ideas, to adapt effectively to the environment, to learn from experience, to engage in various forms of reasoning, to overcome obstacles by taking thought. Although these individual differences can be substantial, they are never entirely consistent: a given person's intellectual performance will vary on different occasions, in different domains, as judged by different criteria. Concepts of "intelligence" are attempts to clarify and organize this complex set of phenomena. Although considerable clarity has been achieved in some areas, no such conceptualization has yet answered all the important questions, and none commands universal assent. Indeed, when two dozen prominent theorists were recently asked to define intelligence, they gave two dozen, somewhat different, definitions.

Intelligence is a property of the mind that encompasses many related abilities, such as the capacities to reason, to plan, to solve problems, to think abstractly, to comprehend ideas, to use language, and to learn. There are several ways to more specifically define intelligence. In some cases, intelligence may include traits such as creativity, personality, character, knowledge, or wisdom. However, some psychologists prefer not to include these traits in the definition of intelligence.

A widely researched index or classification of intelligence among scientists is intelligence quotient (IQ). IQ is a summary index, calculated by testing individuals' abilities in a variety of tasks and producing a composite score to represent overall ability, e.g., Wechsler Adult Intelligence Scale. It is used to predict educational outcomes and other variables of interest.

Others have attempted to measure intelligence indirectly by looking at individuals' or group's educational attainment, although this risks bias from other demographic factors, such as age, income, gender and cultural background, all of which can affect educational attainment.

Dissatisfaction with traditional IQ tests has led to the development of alternative theories. In 1983, Howard Gardner proposed the theory of multiple intelligences, which broadens the conventional definition of intelligence, to include logical, linguistic, spatial, musical, kinesthetic, naturalist, intrapersonal and interpersonal intelligences. He chose not to include spiritual intelligence amongst his "intelligences" due to the challenge of codifying quantifiable scientific criteria, but suggested an "existential intelligence" as viable.

=== Religiosity ===
The term religiosity refers to degrees of religious behaviour, belief, or spirituality. The measurement of religiosity is hampered by the difficulties involved in defining what is meant by the term. Numerous studies have explored the different components of religiosity, with most finding some distinction between religious beliefs/doctrine, religious practice, and spirituality. Studies can measure religious practice by counting attendance at religious services, religious beliefs/doctrine by asking a few doctrinal questions, and spirituality by asking respondents about their sense of oneness with the divine or through detailed standardized measurements. When religiosity is measured, it is important to specify which aspects of religiosity are referred to.

According to Mark Chaves, decades of anthropological, sociological, and psychological research have established that "religious congruence" (the assumption that religious beliefs and values are tightly integrated in an individual's mind or that religious practices and behaviors follow directly from religious beliefs or that religious beliefs are chronologically linear and stable across different contexts) is actually rare. People's religious ideas are fragmented, loosely connected, and context-dependent, as in all other domains of culture and in life. The beliefs, affiliations, and behaviors of any individual are complex activities that have many sources including culture. As examples of religious incongruence he notes, "Observant Jews may not believe what they say in their Sabbath prayers. Christian ministers may not believe in God. And people who regularly dance for rain don't do it in the dry season."

Demographic studies often show wide diversity of religious beliefs, belonging, and practices in both religious and non-religious populations. For instance, out of Americans who are not religious and not seeking religion, 68% believe in God, 12% are atheists, and 17% are agnostics; as for self-identification of religiosity, 18% consider themselves religious, 37% consider themselves spiritual but not religious, and 42% consider themselves neither spiritual nor religious, while 21% pray every day and 24% pray once a month. Global studies on religion also show diversity.

Religion and belief in gods are not necessarily synonymous since nontheistic religions exist including within traditions like Hinduism and Christianity. According to anthropologist Jack David Eller, "atheism is quite a common position, even within religion" and that "surprisingly, atheism is not the opposite or lack, let alone the enemy, of religion but is the most common form of religion."

== Studies comparing religious belief and IQ ==
In a 2013 meta-analysis of 63 studies, led by professor Miron Zuckerman, a correlation of -.20 to -.25 between religiosity and IQ was particularly strong when assessing beliefs (which in their view reflects intrinsic religiosity), but the negative effects were less defined when behavioral aspects of religion (such as church-going) were examined. They note limitations on this since viewing intrinsic religiosity as being about religious beliefs represents American Protestantism more than Judaism or Catholicism, both of which see behavior as just as important as religious beliefs. They also noted that the available data did not allow adequate consideration of the role of religion type and of culture in assessing the relationship between religion and intelligence. Most of the studies reviewed were American and 87% of participants in those studies were from the United States, Canada, and the United Kingdom. They noted, "Clearly, the present results are limited to Western societies." The meta-analysis discussed three possible explanations: First, intelligent people are less likely to conform and, thus, are more likely to resist religious dogma, although this theory was contradicted in mostly atheist societies such as the Scandinavian populations, where the religiosity-IQ relationship still existed. Second, intelligent people tend to adopt an analytic (as opposed to intuitive) thinking style, which has been shown to undermine religious beliefs. Third, intelligent people may have less need for religious beliefs and practices, as some of the functions of religiosity can be given by intelligence instead. Such functions include the presentation of a sense that the world is orderly and predictable, a sense of personal control and self-regulation and a sense of enhancing self-esteem and belongingness.

A 2016 re-analysis of the Zuckerman et al study, found that the negative intelligence-religiosity associations were weaker and less generalizable across time, space, samples, measures, and levels of analysis, but still robust. For example, the negative intelligence–religiosity association was insignificant with samples using men, pre-college participants, and taking into account grade point average. When other variables like education and quality of human conditions were taken into account, positive relation between IQ and disbelief in God(s) was reduced. According to Dutton and Van der Linden, the re-analysis had controls that were too strict (life quality index and proximity of countries) and also some of the samples used problematic proxies of religiosity, which took away from the variance in the correlations. As such, the reduction of significance in the negative correlation likely reflected a sample anomaly. They also observed that the "weak but significant" correlation of -.20 on intelligence and religiosity from the Zuckerman study was also found when comparing intelligence with other variables like education and income.

Zuckerman et al. published an updated metanalysis in 2019 with 83 studies finding "strong evidence" of a negative correlation between religiosity and intelligence of -.20 to -.23. Zuckerman cautioned that the "effect size of the relation is small", not generalizable beyond the Western world and that predicting religiosity from intelligence for individuals is fallible.

Researchers Helmuth Nyborg and Richard Lynn compared belief in God and IQs. Using data from a U.S. study of 6,825 adolescents, the authors found that the average IQ of atheists was 6 points higher than the average IQ of non-atheists. The authors also investigated the link between belief in a god and average national IQs in 137 countries. The authors reported a correlation of 0.60 between national IQ and disbelief in a god, which was determined to be "highly statistically significant". ('Belief in a god' is not identical to 'religiosity.' Some nations have high proportions of people who do not believe in a god, but who may nevertheless be highly religious, following non-theistic belief systems such as Buddhism or Taoism.)

Other researchers found Nyborg and Lynn's findings questionable since sporadic and inconsistent estimates were the basis for atheism rates, multiple factors better explain the fluctuations, including reversals, in both religion and IQ by nations through time; data that contradicted their hypothesis was minimized, and secularization debates among scholars were ignored, all of which rendered any predictability as unreliable.

The Lynn et al. paper findings were discussed by Professor Gordon Lynch, from London's Birkbeck College, who expressed concern that the study failed to take into account a complex range of social, economic and historical factors, each of which has been shown to interact with religion and IQ in different ways. Gallup surveys, for example, have found that the world's poorest countries are consistently the most religious, perhaps because religion plays a more functional role (helping people cope) in poorer nations. Even at the scale of the individual, IQ may not directly cause more disbelief in gods. Dr. David Hardman of London Metropolitan University says: "It is very difficult to conduct true experiments that would explicate a causal relationship between IQ and religious belief." He adds that other studies do nevertheless correlate IQ with being willing or able to question beliefs.

In a sample of 2307 adults in the US., IQ was found to negatively correlate with self reports of religious identification, private practice or religion, mindfulness, religious support, and fundamentalism, but not spirituality. The relationships were relatively unchanged after controlling for personality, education, age, and gender, and were typically modest. The study was limited only to Christian denominations.

A critical review of the research on intelligence and religiosity by Sickles et al. observed that conclusions vary widely in the literature because most studies use inconsistent and poor measures for both religiosity and intelligence. Furthermore, they noted intelligence differences seen between people of varying religious beliefs and non-theists is most likely the result of educational differences that are in turn the result of holding fundamentalist religious beliefs rather than the result of innate differences in intelligence between them.

According to Dutton et al. negative correlations on religion may be correlated with autistic spectrum on specialized learning ability since when members of the same ethnic group are compared there are very few differences in IQ in general.

In non-western countries like Korea, where religion is seen differently than in the West, non-religious people had lower mean IQs than religious persons.

A 2022 metanalysis of 89 studies found a small and weak negative correlation of -.14 and noted that the findings were not generalizable beyond a Western contexts.

=== Studies examining theistic and atheistic cognitive style ===
The idea that analytical thinking makes one less likely to be religious is an idea supported by Gervais and Noernzayan's 2012 study. They observed that intuitive thinking tended to increase intrinsic religiosity, intuitive religious belief and belief in supernatural entities. They also added a causative element, finding that subtly triggering analytic thinking can increase religious disbelief. They concluded that "Combined, these studies indicate that analytic processing is one factor (presumably among several) that promotes religious disbelief." While these studies linked religious disbelief to analytical rather than intuitive thinking, they urged caution in the interpretation of these results, noting that they were not judging the relative merits of analytic and intuitive thinking in promoting optimal decision making, or the merits or validity of religiosity as a whole.

In 2017, Calin-Jageman replicated the Gervais 2012 experiment and found no link between analytic thinking and decrease in religious belief. In another replication attempt, another team failed to get the same results as Gervais and Noernzayan . For which, Gervais and Noernzayan acknowledged that they no longer felt confident in their original 2012 findings.

In 2018, Gervais et al did a follow up study to assess if analytic thinking correlated with atheism in 13 countries and found that cross-culturally, the relation is very weak and fickle and that culture plays a bigger role than analytic thinking on core beliefs.

Harvard researchers found evidence suggesting that all religious beliefs become more confident when participants are thinking intuitively (atheists and theists each become more convinced). Thus reflective thinking generally tends to create more qualified, doubted belief. Reflective thinking was further correlated with greater changes in beliefs since childhood: these changes were towards atheism for the most reflective participants, and towards greater belief in a god for the most intuitive thinkers — a 2025 article in Religious Studies conceptually replicated the former analytic apostasy across most regions of the globe. The studies controlled for personality differences and cognitive ability, suggesting the differences were due to thinking styles – not simply IQ or raw cognitive ability. An experiment in the study found that participants moved towards greater belief in a god after writing essays about how intuition yielded a right answer or reflection yielded a wrong answer (and conversely, towards atheism if primed to think about either a failure of intuition or success of reflection). The authors say it is all evidence that a relevant factor in religious belief is thinking style. The authors add that, even if intuitive thinking tends to increase belief in a god, "it does not follow that reliance on intuition is always irrational or unjustified."

A 2017 study re-analyzed the relationship between intuitive and analytical thinking and its correlation with supernatural belief among three measurements (Pilgrimage setting, supernatural attribution, brain stimulation) and found no significant correlation.

Reviewing psychological studies on atheists, Miguel Farias noted that studies concluding that analytical thinking leads to lower religious belief "do not imply that atheists are more conscious or reflective of their own beliefs, or that atheism is the outcome of a conscious refutation of previously held religious beliefs" since they too have variant beliefs such as in conspiracy theories of the naturalistic variety. He notes that studies on deconversion indicate that a greater proportion of people who leave religion do so for motivational rather than rational reasons, and the majority of deconversions occur in adolescence and young adulthood when one is emotionally volatile. Furthermore, he notes that atheists are indistinguishable from New Age individuals or Gnostics since there are commonalities such as being individualistic, non-conformist, liberal, and valuing hedonism and sensation.

Concerning the cognitive science studies on atheists, Johnathan Lanman notes that there are implicit and explicit beliefs which vary among individuals. An individual's atheism and theism may be related to the amount of "credibility enhancing displays" (CRED) one experiences in that those who are exposed more to theistic CRED will likely be theist and those who have less exposure to theistic CRED will likely be atheists.

Neurological research on mechanisms of belief and non-belief, using Christians and atheists as subjects, by Harris et al. have shown that the brain networks involved in evaluating the truthfulness of both religious and non religious statements are generally the same regardless of religiosity. However, the activity within these networks differed across the religiosity of statements, with the religious statements activating the insula and anterior cingulate cortex to a greater degree, and the non religious statements activating hippocampal and superior frontal regions to a greater degree. The areas associated with religious statements are generally associated with salient emotional processing, while areas associated with non religious statements are generally associated with memory. The association between the salience network and religious statements is congruent with the cognitive theory proposed by Boyer that the implausibility of religious propositions are offset by their salience. The same neural networks were active in both Christians and atheists even when dealing with "blasphemous statements" to each other's worldviews. Furthermore, it supports the idea that "intuition" and "reason" are not two separate and segregated activities but are intertwined in both theists and atheists.

A 2024 review of the literature on cognitive style noted that cognitive scientists understand there to be two systems of the mind: intuition and rationality, which intersect and overlap. Though some studies initially found some correlations between rationality and cognitive style, some studies failed to replicate. Some research has replicated correlations between disbelief/apostasy and rationality or reflection, but these correlations are small and are compatible with cases of reflective believers and converts indicating that reflective thinking does not guarantee or even characterize areligiosity or apostasy. A general review of the literature states that there are no correlations between rationality and belief/disbelief and instead other factors such as upbringing, whether religious or not, better explains why people end up religious or not and that rationality is compatible with the entire sprectrum of belief and disbelief.

In an international study, very few scientists stated that scientific training or knowledge played a role in any declines in personal religiosity. Cross-national research on atheist scientists from the US and UK indicates that the majority came from a nonreligious upbringing and never had a religious affiliation. Also, fewer than half of the atheist scientists who were exposed to religion in their youth said science played a role in them becoming an atheist.

=== Studies examining religiosity and emotional intelligence ===
A small 2004 study by Ellen Paek examined the extent to which religiosity (in which only Christians were surveyed), operationalized as religious orientation and religious behaviour, is related to the controversial idea of emotional intelligence (EI). The study examined the extent to which religious orientation and behavior were related to self-reported EI in 148 church-attending adult Christians. (Non-religious individuals were not part of the study.) The study found that the individuals' self-reported religious orientation was positively correlated with their perceiving themselves to have greater EI. While the number of religious group activities was positively associated with perceived EI, the number of years of church attendance was unrelated. Significant positive correlations were also found between level of religious commitment and perceived EI. Thus, the Christian volunteers were more likely to consider themselves emotionally intelligent if they spent more time in group activities and had more commitment to their beliefs.

Tischler, Biberman and McKeage warn that there is still ambiguity in the above concepts. In their 2002 article, entitled "Linking emotional intelligence, spirituality and workplace performance: Definitions, models and ideas for research", they reviewed literature on both EI and various aspect of spirituality. They found that both EI and spirituality appear to lead to similar attitudes, behaviors and skills, and that there often seems to be confusion, intersection and linking between the two constructs.

Recently, Łowicki and Zajenkowski investigated the potential associations between various aspects of religious belief and ability and trait EI. In their first study they found that ability EI was positively correlated with general level of belief in God or a higher power. Their next study, conducted among Polish Christians, replicated the previous result and revealed that both trait and ability EI were negatively related to extrinsic religious orientation and negative religious coping.

=== Studies exploring religiosity and educational attainment ===
The relationship between the level of religiosity and one's level of education has been a philosophical, as well as a scientific and political concern since the second half of the 20th century.

The parameters in this field are slightly different compared to those brought forward above: if the "level of religiosity" remains a concept which is difficult to determine scientifically, on the contrary, the "level of education" is, indeed, easy to compile, official data on this topic being publicly accessible to anyone in most countries.

Different studies available show contrasting conclusions. An analysis of World Values Survey data showed that in most countries, there is no significant relationship between education and religious attendance, with some differences between "Western" countries and former socialist countries, which the authors attribute to historical, political, and economic factors, not intelligence. Other studies have noted a positive relationship.

A 2016 Pew Center global study on religion and education around the world ranked Jews as the most educated (13.4 years of schooling) followed by Christians (9.3 years of schooling). The religiously unaffiliated—a category which includes atheists, agnostics and those who describe their religion as "nothing in particular"—ranked overall as the third most educated religious group (8.8 years of schooling) followed by Buddhists (7.9 years of schooling), Muslims (5.6 years of schooling), and Hindus (5.6 years of schooling). In the youngest age (25-34) group surveyed, Jews averaged 13.8 years of schooling, the unaffiliated group averaged 10.3 years of schooling, Christians averaged 9.9 years of schooling, Buddhists averaged 9.7 years of schooling, Hindus averaged 7.1 years of schooling, and Muslims averaged 6.7 years of schooling. 61% of Jews, 20% of Christians, 16% of the unaffiliated, 12% of Buddhists, 10% of Hindus, and 8% of Muslims have graduate and post-graduate degrees. The study observed that the probability of having a college degree in the U.S. is higher for all religious minorities surveyed (perhaps partly due to selective immigration policies that favor highly skilled applicants), including the unaffiliated group which ranks in the fifth place, being higher than the national average of 39%.

== See also ==
- Outline of human intelligence
- Psychology of religion
- Relationship between religion and science
- Heritability of IQ
- Environment and intelligence
