= Apology (act) =

Verbal or written expression of regret or remorse

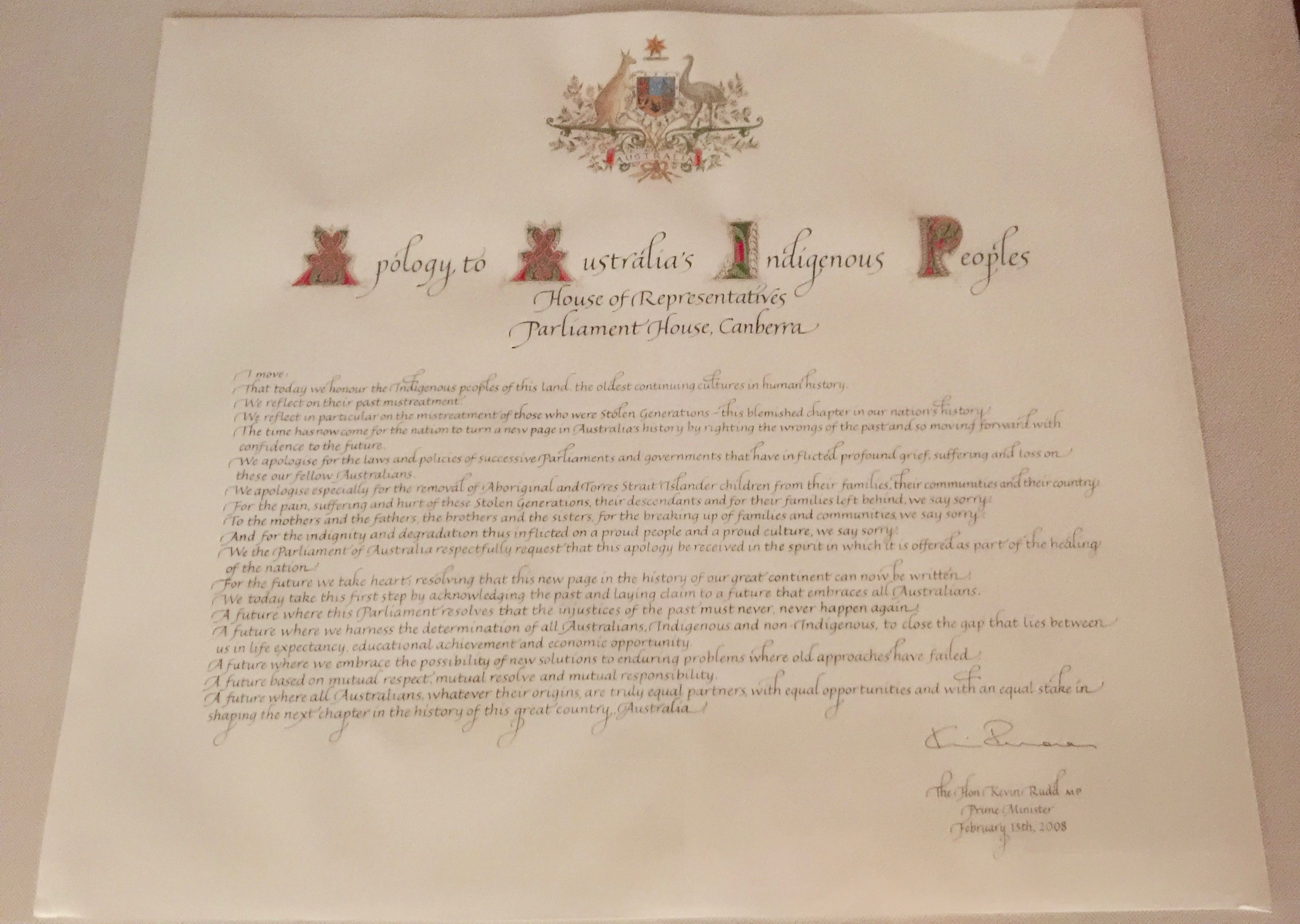
Official apology by the Australian government to its indigenous peoples

An apology is a voluntary expression of regret or remorse for actions, while apologizing (American English; apologising in British English) is the act of expressing regret or remorse. In informal situations, it may be called saying sorry. The goal of an apology is generally forgiveness, reconciliation, and restoration of the relationship between the people involved in a dispute.

The nature of an apology involves at least two people where one has offended the other. Alternatively, it can involve two groups of people, one having previously offended the other. This is seen in the figure, with the Australian Government (an institution) apologizing for previous wrongs to the Indigenous (a large ethnic group).

According to attribution theory, giving an apology as early as possible leads to less conflict during the discussion and increases communication satisfaction. The way the apology is given affects the outcome and the process of forgiveness. For example, putting genuine emotion into an apology generally helps resolve disputes more quickly and helps rid negative emotions faster. When responding to a crisis, there are multiple implications and ethical standards organizations and groups might follow.

== Elements ==
The three elements of an apology are:

1. That the person apologizing was, in some way, responsible for the unjust actions taken;
2. That the person apologizing is aware of the injustices that resulted from those actions; and
3. That the person apologizing intends to behave differently in the future.

Most philosophers believe that apologies require the person apologizing to hold certain emotions, namely regret or remorse. (The relevant difference between regret and remorse is that people who feel remorse believe that the situation was caused by their actions or inactions, whereas people can feel regret for situations beyond their control or outside of their involvement.) Others believe, however, that this might not be necessary in all situations.

In some cultural contexts apologies are used even where there is no responsibility, for example, as a way of making a polite request, or of acknowledging hurt or inconvenience. This is the case in the Canadian province of Ontario, which has a law protecting those who apologize from a presumption of having admitted fault.

== Efficacy ==
The way an apology is communicated and its timing affects the likelihood of success. The timing of the apology, the importance of the relationship, and the characteristics of the precipitating event are all factors that affect whether an apology will be acknowledged or gain forgiveness. When an apology is given in an effective style, the offender has a greater chance of being forgiven.

Apologizing shortly after the incident, or after the resulting problems were brought to the attention of the offender, can increase the apology's effectiveness.

The most effective apology statements focus on the harm done to victims while minimizing descriptions of the offender's context, motivation, or justification. An effective statement apologizes for the offender's own actions, such as "I'm sorry I said that", and not for other people's reactions to those actions ("I'm sorry people were offended").

Sincerity matters, and the measure of sincerity is usually the recipient's view of the offender's emotional state, plus a credible commitment to not cause the same problem in the future. Effective apologies clearly express remorse and may name efforts of restitution that the offender commits to undertake. Apologies are more effective when they cost the offender something, whether that cost is financial, social status, or a commitment to do better in the future.

Some Western scholars believe that integrative communication is key for forgiveness. The integrative communication approach avoids conflict by having those involved reveal their emotions in a calm manner. Depending on the communication in the relationship, people will either avoid the other person, seek revenge, or forgive. Satisfying conversations are associated with delayed apologies and attributions of understanding. Communicating a sincere apology and displaying regret captures a genuine and positive response while acknowledging the recipient's feelings.

When a group is at fault, such as a business, the effects of an apology might depend upon the person who makes the apology. For example, people will be more empathetic if an employee apologizes for a business error, but they may feel a better sense of justice if the head of the company makes the apology and offers compensation.

== Organizational and group apologies ==
In a communication crisis, there is an extensive process for apologizing. The rhetorical concept of kategória involves a community accusing an individual or organization of misconduct that leads to a social legitimation crisis. Trust is broken with wrongful actions and people expect to receive apologies in order to give forgiveness to re-establish the socio-cultural order. An apology during a crisis response must follow ethical standards in context, sincerity, and truthfulness in a timely and voluntary manner. The content for the communication includes an offer to correct the offense, a request for forgiveness, an expression of regret and admission of full responsibility, as well as true account of the problem.

== Whether to apologize ==
For political and business leaders, public apologies involve some risks. An apology that is "too little, too late, or too transparently tactical" can backfire and result in more damage. A public leader may refuse to apologize to avoid being seen as incompetent.

Some US states have adopted laws that allow healthcare providers to apologize for bad outcomes without the apology being considered evidence of wrongdoing for malpractice claims. These laws are associated with claims being settled more quickly and at a lower cost, especially for severe injuries.

== Forced apologies ==
The forced apology, in which the perceived offender is coerced into making an apology, has a long history. As a form of ritual public humiliation, the 18th-century philosopher Immanuel Kant approved of the forced apology. Kant thought that a monetary fine was not a fit punishment for insults delivered by a wealthy person of high social status to a person of low social status, because the social cost of making any apology to a low-status person was much greater than the financial cost of a fine. Instead, Kant argued that legally forcing the guilty party to make a humiliating public apology to the poor or low-status person was a more appropriate punishment, because it punished the man who had humiliated someone with being humiliated himself.

In modern Western cultures, the forced apology is dismissed as a meaningless theatrical gesture. It is generally said that an apology must be voluntary to be acceptable.

=== Other poor examples ===
- Non-apology: a statement that looks like an apology but does not express remorse.
- Insincere apology: a statement that expresses remorse that is not felt. This may be pro forma apology, such as a routine letter from a large business that expresses regret that a small order was not satisfactory in some respect. In such a case, the recipient might not expect any employee to have any particular emotions. Scholars generally agree that sincerity is usually a desirable feature of an apology, but they disagree over whether sincerity is a necessary condition for a true apology in such cases.

== Critique ==
Each conflict is different, and therefore affects the time in which an apology should be made. People perceive wrongful actions in various ways and need time to cope with the circumstances and to process the offense. More research can be done to interpret negative and positive emotions during the time of the apology, in response to multiple apologies, when only one apology is received, and on the effects on the relationship after an apology. Communicating an apology varies between relationships, politicians, organizations, and companies because of what is expected by the individual, media, or society. Another important factor is the age of the individuals and what they require to forgive and move on. The communication of an apology's interpretation either verbally or non-verbally will vary among the population. Apologies can be seen as ambiguous and be made in order to satisfy the victim's needs and feel more as an empty gesture. Apologies are not always meant to be sincere and may be used for manipulation purposes. Repeated or frequent apologies can be more offensive than never apologizing.

== See also ==
- Apologia, a formal defense of a belief or action
- Apology Act, 2009
- Shame
- "Mistakes were made", rhetoric device commonly used in poor examples of apologies
