= Relational transgression =

Violation of an implicit or explicit relational rules

Relational transgressions occur when people violate implicit or explicit relational rules. These transgressions include a wide variety of behaviors. The boundaries of relational transgressions are permeable. Betrayal for example, is often used as a synonym for a relational transgression. In some instances, betrayal can be defined as a rule violation that is traumatic to a relationship, and in other instances as destructive conflict or reference to infidelity. Relational transgressions are subjective. Culture, sex, and age may change an individual's viewpoint on transgressions. Considering the victim's perspective and a couple's communication helps better understand relational transgressions.

Relational transgressions are a part of any relationship. In each instance, partners must weigh the severity of the transgression against how much they value the relationship. In some cases, trust can be so severely damaged that repair strategies are fruitless. With each transgression both transgressor and victim assume risks. The transgressor's efforts at reconciliation may be rejected by the victim, which results in loss of face and potentially an avenue of attack by the victim. If the victim offers forgiveness, there is risk that the transgressor may view the forgiveness as a personality trait that may prompt future transgressions (e.g., “I’ll be forgiven by my partner just like every other time”).

These risks aside, promptly engaging in repair strategies helps to ensure the relationship recovers from transgressions. Addressing relational transgressions can be a very painful process. Utilizing repair strategies can have a transformative effect on the relationship through redefining rules and boundaries. An added benefit can be gained through the closeness that can be realized as partners address transgressions. Engaging in relationship talk such as metatalk prompts broader discussions about what each partner desires from the relationship and aligns expectations. Such efforts can mitigate the effects of future transgressions, or even minimize the frequency and severity of transgressions.

Scholars tend to delineate relational transgressions into three categories or approaches. The first approach focuses on the aspect of certain behaviors as a violation of relational norms and rules. The second approach focuses on the interpretive consequences of certain behaviors, particularly the degree to which they hurt the victim, imply disregard for the victim, and imply disregard for the relationship. The third and final approach focuses more specifically on behaviors that constitute infidelity (a common form of relational transgression).

Common forms of relational transgressions include the following: dating others, wanting to date others, having sex with others, deceiving one's partner, flirting with someone else, kissing someone else, keeping secrets, becoming emotionally involved with someone else, and betraying the partner's confidence.

== Conceptual and operational definitions ==
=== Rule violations ===
Rule violations are events, actions, and behaviors that violate an implicit or explicit relationship norm or rule. Explicit rules tend to be relationship specific, such as those prompted by the bad habits of a partner (e.g., excessive drinking or drug abuse), or those that emerge from attempts to manage conflict (e.g., rules that prohibit spending time with a former spouse or talking about a former girlfriend or boyfriend). Implicit rules tend to be those that are accepted as cultural standards for proper relationship conduct (e.g., monogamy and secrets kept private). The focus on relational transgressions as rule violations presents an opportunity to examine a wide range of behaviors across a variety of relationship types. This method facilitates analysis of transgressions from a rules perspective. In a study of college students' relational transgressions, the following nine categories emerged consistently.

1. Inappropriate interaction: Instances in which a partner performs badly during an interaction, typically a conflict episode.
2. Lack of sensitivity: Instances in which a partner exhibits thoughtless, disrespectful, or inconsiderate behavior. Offender demonstrates a lack of concern or emotional responsiveness when expected and appropriate.
3. Extrarelational involvement: Sexual or emotional involvement with persons other than the offended party. Offender does not confound involvement with deception.
4. Relational threat confounded by deception: Instances in which a partner participates in sexual or emotional involvement with persons other than the offended party and then uses deception to conceal the involvement.
5. Disregard for primary relationship: Actions that indicate the transgressor does not privilege the primary relationship; chooses other people or activities over partner or changes plans.
6. Abrupt termination: Actions that terminate a relationship with no warning and no explanation.
7. Broken promises and rule violations: Occasions during which a partner fails to keep a promise, changes plans with no warning or explanation, or violates a rule that the offended person assumes was binding.
8. Deception, secrets and privacy: Instances in which a partner lied, kept important information a secret, failed to keep sensitive information private, or violated privacy boundaries.
9. Abuse: Verbal or physical threats.

Cameron, Ross, and Holmes (2002) identified 10 categories of common relational negative behavior that constitute relational transgressions as rule violations:

1. Broken promises
2. Overreaction to the victim's behavior
3. Inconsiderate behavior
4. Violating the victim's desired level of intimacy
5. Neglecting the victim
6. Threat of infidelity
7. Infidelity
8. Verbal aggression toward the victim
9. Unwarranted disagreement
10. Violent behavior toward the victim

=== Infidelity ===
Infidelity is widely recognized as one of the most hurtful relational transgressions. Around 30% to 40% of dating relationships are marked by at least one incident of sexual infidelity. It is typically among the most difficult transgressions to forgive. There are typically four methods of discovery:

1. Finding out from a third party.
2. Witnessing the infidelity firsthand, such as walking in on your partner with someone else.
3. Having the partner admit to infidelity after another partner questions.
4. Having the partner tell their partner on their own.

Partners who found out through a third party or by witnessing the infidelity firsthand were the least likely to forgive. Partners who confessed on their own were the most likely to be forgiven.

==== Sexual vs. emotional infidelity ====
Sexual infidelity refers to sexual activity with someone other than a person's partner. Sexual infidelity can span a wide range of behavior and thoughts, including: sexual intercourse, heavy petting, passionate kissing, sexual fantasies, and sexual attraction. It can involve a sustained relationship, a one-night stand, or a prostitute. Most people in the United States openly disapprove of sexual infidelity, but research indicates that infidelity is common. Men are typically more likely than women to engage in a sexual affair, regardless if they are married or in a dating relationship.

Emotional infidelity refers to emotional involvement with another person, which leads one's partner to channel emotional resources to someone else. Emotional infidelity can involve strong feelings of love and intimacy, nonsexual fantasies of falling in love, romantic attraction, or the desire to spend time with another individual. Emotional infidelity may involve a coworker, Internet partner, face-to-face communication, or a long distance phone call. Emotional infidelity is likely related to dissatisfaction with the communication and social support an individual is receiving in his or her current relationship.

Each type of infidelity evokes different responses. Sexual infidelity is more likely to result in hostile, shocked, repulsed, humiliated, homicidal, or suicidal feelings. Emotional infidelity is more likely to evoke feelings of being undesirable, insecure, depressed, or abandoned. When both types of infidelity are present in a relationship, couples are more likely to break up than when only one type of infidelity is involved.

==== Gender differences in infidelity ====
While gender is not a reliable predictor of how any individual will react to sexual and emotional infidelity, there are nonetheless differences in how men and women on average react to sexual and emotional infidelity. Culturally Western men, relative to culturally Western women, find it more difficult to forgive a partner's sexual infidelity than a partner's emotional infidelity. Western men are also more likely to break up in response to a partner's sexual infidelity than in response to a partner's emotional infidelity. Conversely, Western women on average find it more difficult to forgive a partner's emotional infidelity than a partner's sexual infidelity, and are more likely to end a relationship in response to a partner's emotional infidelity. A possible explanation for these differences has been proposed by evolutionary psychologists: over human evolution, a partner's sexual infidelity placed men, but not women, at risk of investing resources in a rival's offspring. Therefore, a partner's sexual infidelity represents a potentially more costly adaptive problem for men than women. As such, modern men have psychological mechanisms that are acutely sensitive to a partner's sexual infidelity.

Whereas on average Western men are more acutely sensitive to sexual infidelity (supposedly driven by evolutionary requirements noted above), Western women are commonly believed to have greater sensitivity to emotional infidelity. This response in women is, by the arguments of the theory above, driven by the perception that emotional infidelity suggests a long-term diversion of a partner's commitment, and a potential loss of resources. Evolutionary psychology explains this difference by arguing that a woman's loss of male support would result in a diminished chance of survival for both the woman and her offspring. Consequently, relationship factors that are more associated with commitment and partner investment play a more critical role in the psyche of women in contrast to men.

When infidelity involves a former romantic partner, as opposed to a new partner, it is perceived to be more distressing – especially for women. Both men and women overall view situations of sexual infidelity as more distressing than situations of emotional involvement. The typical man, however, viewed only the former partner scenario as more distressing with regard to sexual infidelity; men made no distinction for emotional infidelity. Women, however, view a former partner scenario as the most distressing option for both sexual and emotional infidelity. Men and women both judge infidels of the opposite gender as acting more intentionally than their own gender.

==== Internet infidelity ====
Recent research provides support for conceptualizing infidelity on a continuum ranging in severity from superficial/informal behavior to involving or goal-directed behavior. This perspective accounts for the varying degrees of behavior (e.g., sexual, emotional) on the Internet. A number of acts not involving direct, one-to-one communication with another person (e.g. posting a personal ad or looking at pornography) can be perceived as forms of infidelity. Thus, communication with another live person is not necessary for infidelity to occur. Accordingly, Internet infidelity is defined by Docan-Morgan and Docan (2007) as follows: "An act or actions engaged via the internet by one person with a committed relationship, where such an act occurs outside the primary relationship, and constitutes a breach of trust and/or violation of agreed-upon norms (overt or covert) by one or both individuals in that relationship with regard to relational exclusivity, and is perceived as having a particular degree of severity by one or both partners."

=== Jealousy ===
==== Characteristics of jealousy ====
Jealousy is the result of a relational transgression, such as a partner having a sexual or emotional affair. Jealousy can also be seen as a transgression in its own right, when a partner's suspicions are unfounded. Thus, jealousy is an important component of relational transgressions. There are several types of jealousy. Romantic jealousy occurs when a partner is concerned that a potential rival might interfere with his or her existing romantic relationship. Sexual jealousy is a specific form of romantic jealousy where an individual worries that a rival is having or wants to have sex with his or her partner.

Other forms of jealousy include:

- Friend jealousy – feeling threatened by a partner's relationships with friends.
- Family jealousy – feeling threatened by a partner's relationships with family members.
- Activity jealousy – perceiving that a partner's activities, such as work, hobbies, or school, are interfering with one's relationship.
- Power jealousy – perceiving that one's influence over a partner is being lost to others.
- Intimacy jealousy – believing that one's partner in engaging in more intimate communication, such as disclosure and advice seeking, with someone else.

Jealousy is different from envy and rivalry. Envy occurs when people want something valuable that someone else has. Rivalry occurs when two people are competing for something that neither person has.

==== Experiencing romantic jealousy ====
Individuals who are experiencing jealous thoughts typically make primary and secondary cognitive appraisals about their particular situation. Primary appraisals involve general evaluations about the existence and quality of a rival relationship. Secondary appraisals involve more specific evaluations about the jealous situation, including possible causes of the jealousy and potential outcomes to the situation. There are four common types of secondary appraisals:

1. Jealous people assess motives.
2. Jealous people compare themselves to their rival.
3. They evaluate their potential alternatives.
4. Finally, jealous people assess their potential loss.

Jealous individuals make appraisals to develop coping strategies and assess potential outcomes.

Jealous individuals normally experience combinations of emotions, in addition to the aforementioned cognitive appraisals. The most common emotions associated with jealousy are fear and anger; people are fearful of losing their relationship and they are often angry at their partner or rival. Other common negative emotions associated with jealousy are sadness, guilt, hurt, and envy. Sometimes, however, jealousy leads to positive emotions, including increased passion, love, and appreciation.

Relational partners sometimes intentionally induce jealousy in their relationship. There are typically two types of goals for jealousy induction. Relational rewards reflect the desire to improve the relationship, increase self-esteem, and increase relational rewards. The second type of goal, relational revenge, reflects the desire to punish one's partner, the need for revenge, and the desire to control one's partner. The tactic of inducing jealousy may produce unintended consequences, as jealousy often leads to other relational transgressions including violence.

==== Communicative responses to jealousy ====
Jealousy can involve a wide range of communicative responses. These responses are based upon the individuals' goals and emotions. The most common of these responses are negative affect expression, integrative communication, and distributive communication. When people want to maintain their relationship, they use integrative communication and compensatory restoration. People who are fearful of losing their relationships typically use compensatory restoration.

Conversely, people who are concerned with maintaining their self-esteem allege that they deny jealous feelings. When individuals are motivated to reduce uncertainty about their partner, they use integrative communication, surveillance, and rival contacts to seek additional information. Communicative responses to jealousy may help reduce uncertainty and restore self-esteem, but they may actually increase uncertainty and negatively impact relationships and self-esteem in some instances. The type of communicative response used is critical.

For example, avoidance/denial may be used to protect one's self-esteem, but it may also result in increased uncertainty and relational dissatisfaction, if the jealous partner is left with lingering suspicions. Similarly, compensatory restoration may improve the relationship in some instances, but it may also communicate low self-esteem and desperation by the jealous individual. Distributive communication, which includes behaviors such as yelling and confrontation, may serve to vent negative emotion and retaliate by making the partner feel bad. This may exacerbate an already negative situation and make reconciliation less likely.

==== Jealousy and relational satisfaction ====
Jealousy is considered to be a relationship dysfunction, though it may have some positive relational properties. These positive properties can be achieved through one’s ability to manage their jealousy, showing concern and care without being aggressive. Negative emotions can be effective if expressed in conjunction with integrative communication. Compensatory restoration, or efforts made by the offender to restore the relationship, can be effective, yet should be exercised carefully, as too much can be detrimental to the relationship.

==== Rumination ====
From the aspect of jealousy, rumination reflects uncomfortable mulling about the security of a relationship. Rumination refers to thoughts that are conscious, recurring, and not demanded by the individual's current environment. Ruminative thoughts occur repetitively and are difficult to eliminate. In the context of relational threats, rumination can be described as obsessive worry about the security of the current relationship. Individuals who ruminate are very likely to respond to jealousy differently from individuals who do not ruminate. Rumination is positively associated with several communicative responses to jealousy (e.g. compensatory restoration, negative affect expression, showing signs of possession, and derogation of competitors) that attempt to strengthen a relationship. Rumination is also associated with responses that are counterproductive. Despite efforts to restore relational intimacy, rumination sustains uncertainty, which thereby forms a cycle where rumination is sustained. Rumination intensifies over time and serves as a constant reminder to the threat to the relationship, resulting in increased negative affect. This negative affect is associated with destructive responses to jealousy including violent communication and violence towards objects. Finally, jealous rumination is associated with relational distress and counterproductive responses to jealousy.

==== Sex differences in jealous emotions and communication ====
Jealous emotions may manifest differently between sexes. Although previous research has shown certain patterns, this may not mean each man or woman will react the same way when dealing with jealous emotions. Women might experience more hurt, sadness, anxiety, and confusion than men. This may be because they often blame themselves for the jealous situation. On the other hand, some men have been found to deny jealous feelings and focus on increasing their self-esteem.

Analysis from an evolutionary perspective would suggest that men focus on competing for mates and displaying resources (e.g., material goods to suggest financial security), while women focus on creating and enhancing social bonds and showcasing their beauty.

=== Deception ===
Deception is a major relational transgression that often leads to feelings of betrayal and distrust between relational partners. Deception violates relational rules and is considered to be a negative violation of expectations. Most people expect friends, relational partners, and even strangers to be truthful most of the time. If people expected most conversations to be untruthful, talking and communicating with others would simply be unproductive and too difficult. On a given day, it is likely that most human beings will either deceive or be deceived by another person. A significant amount of deception may occur between romantic and relational partners.

==== Types ====
Deception includes several types of communications or omissions that serve to distort or omit the complete truth. Deception itself is intentionally managing verbal and/or nonverbal messages so that the message receiver will believe in a way that the message sender knows is false. Intent is critical with regard to deception. Intent differentiates between deception and an honest mistake. The Interpersonal Deception Theory explores the interrelation between communicative context and sender and receiver cognitions and behaviors in deceptive exchanges.

Five primary forms of deception consist of the following:

- Lies: Making up information or giving information that is the opposite or very different from the truth.
- Equivocations: Making an indirect, ambiguous, or contradictory statement.
- Concealments: Omitting information that is important or relevant to the given context, or engaging in behavior that helps hide relevant information.
- Exaggeration: Overstatement or stretching the truth to a degree.
- Understatement: Minimization or downplaying aspects of the truth.

==== Motives ====
There are three primary motivations for deceptions in close relationships.

- Partner-focused motives: Using deception to avoid hurting the partner, helping the partner to enhance or maintain his or her self-esteem, avoid worrying the partner, and protecting the partner's relationship with a third party are all examples of partner-focused motives. Partner-motivated deception can sometimes be viewed as socially polite and relationally beneficial.
- Self-focused motives: Using deception to enhance or protect their self-image, wanting to shield themselves from anger, embarrassment, or criticism. Self-focused deception is generally perceived as a more serious transgression than partner-focused deception because the deceiver is acting for selfish reasons rather than for the good of the relationship.
- Relationship-focused motives: Using deception to limit relationship harm by avoiding conflict or relational trauma. Relationally motivated deception can be beneficial to a relationship, and other times it can be harmful by further complicating matters.

==== Detection ====
Deception detection between relational partners is extremely difficult, unless a partner tells a blatant or obvious lie or contradicts something the other partner knows to be true. While it is difficult to deceive a partner over a long period of time, deception often occurs in day-to-day conversations between relational partners. Detecting deception is difficult because there are no known completely reliable indicators of deception. Deception, however, places a significant cognitive load on the deceiver. He or she must recall previous statements so that his or her story remains consistent and believable. As a result, deceivers often leak important information both verbally and nonverbally.

Deception and its detection is a complex, fluid, and cognitive process that is based on the context of the message exchange. The Interpersonal Deception Theory posits that interpersonal deception is a dynamic, iterative process of mutual influence between a sender, who manipulates information to depart from the truth, and a receiver, who attempts to establish the validity of the message. A deceiver's actions are interrelated to the message receiver's actions. It is during this exchange that the deceiver will reveal verbal and nonverbal information about deceit. Some research has found that there are some cues that may be correlated with deceptive communication, but scholars frequently disagree about the effectiveness of many of these cues to serve as reliable indicators. Noted deception scholar Aldert Vrij even states that there is no nonverbal behavior that is uniquely associated with deception. As previously stated, a specific behavioral indicator of deception does not exist. There are, however, some nonverbal behaviors that have been found to be correlated with deception. Vrij found that examining a "cluster" of these cues was a significantly more reliable indicator of deception than examining a single cue.

In terms of perceptions about the significance of deceiving a partner, women and men typically differ in their beliefs about deception. Women view deception as a much more profound relational transgression than men. Additionally, women rate lying in general as a less acceptable behavior than men. Finally, women are much more likely to view any act of lying as significant (regardless of the subject matter) and more likely to report negative emotional reactions to lying.

===== Truth bias =====
The truth bias significantly impairs the ability of relational partners to detect deception. In terms of deception, a truth bias reflects a tendency to judge more messages as truths than lies, independent of their actual veracity. When judging message veracity, the truth bias contributes to an overestimate of the actual number of truths relative to the base rate of actual truths. The truth bias is especially strong within close relationships. People are highly inclined to trust the communications of others and are unlikely to question the relational partner unless faced with a major deviation of behavior that forces a reevaluation. When attempting to detect deceit from a familiar person or relational partner, a large amount of information about the partner is brought to mind. This information essentially overwhelms the receiver's cognitive ability to detect and process any cues to deception. It is somewhat easier to detect deception in strangers, when less information about that person is brought to mind.

=== Hurtful messages ===
Messages that convey negative feelings or rejection lead to emotions such as hurt and anger. Hurtful messages are associated with less satisfying relationships. Intentionally hurtful messages are among the most serious, as perceived by a partner. Unlike physical pain that usually subsides over time, hurtful messages and hurt feelings often persist for a long period of time and be recalled even years after the event. The interpersonal damage caused by hurtful messages is sometimes permanent. People are more likely to be upset if they believe their relational partner said something to deliberately hurt them. Some of the most common forms of hurtful messages include evaluations, accusations, and informative statements.

Feeling devalued is a central component of hurtful messages. Similar to verbally aggressive messages, hurtful messages that are stated intensely may be viewed as particularly detrimental. The cliché "It's not what you say, but how you say it" is very applicable with regard to recipients' appraisals of hurtful messages. Females tend to experience more hurt than males in response to hurtful messages.

== Forgiveness ==
=== Conceptualizing forgiveness ===
Individuals tend to experience a wide array of complex emotions following a relational transgression. These emotions are shown to have utility as an initial coping mechanism. For example, fear can result in a protective orientation following a serious transgression; sadness results in contemplation and reflection while disgust causes us to repel from its source. However, beyond the initial situation these emotions can be detrimental to one's mental and physical state. Consequently, forgiveness is viewed as a more productive means of dealing with the transgression along with engaging the one who committed the transgression.

Forgiving is not the act of excusing or condoning. Rather, it is the process whereby negative emotions are transformed into positive emotions for the purpose of bringing emotional normalcy to a relationship. In order to achieve this transformation the offended must forgo retribution and claims for retribution. McCullough, Worthington, and Rachal (1997) defined forgiveness as a, “set of motivational changes whereby one becomes (a) decreasingly motivated to retaliate against an offending relationship partner, (b) decreasingly motivated to maintain estrangement from the offender, and (c) increasingly motivated by conciliation and goodwill for the offender, despite the offender’s hurtful actions”. In essence, relational partners choose constructive behaviors that show an emotional commitment and willingness to sacrifice in order to achieve a state of forgiveness.

=== Victim's perspective of forgiveness ===
When considering forgiveness regarding relational transgressions, it is essential to consider the victim's perspective about forgiveness. A study by Martinez-Diaz et al. (2021) identified different strategies of forgiveness, highlighting the victim's perspective about the transgressor's actions and offenses. In the study assessing victim's perspective of forgiveness seeking behaviors after transgressions, several different transgression characteristics are considered by the victim. These include intentionality, severity, frequency, benevolence, etc. It was found that offenders must express commitment to change and ensure that the said transgressions will not repeat. Restorative action after a transgression, such as apologies, were found to be helpful when the offense was unintentional. However, when the offense was found to be intentional, restorative actions were not useful. Victims believed that both verbal and behavioral responses that directly acknowledge the harm caused by the relational transgression promote forgiveness. However, the study indicated that the avoidance or the distancing from the offender could not have been avoided by the forgiveness seeking behaviors.

=== Culture and forgiveness ===
Culture may also affect the way forgiveness and relational transgressions are approached and perceived. A study conducted by Zhang et al. (2019) investigated how face concerns, self-construal, and apologies might influence forgiveness and reconciliation following relational transgressions in the United States and China, offering a more rich, inclusive perspective on forgiveness.

Utilizing face-negotiation theory, researchers found that interdependent self-construal (how an individual defines themself in relation to others) other-face concerns positively correlate with forgiveness, while independent self-construal (identifying as unique and independent) and self-face concerns negatively correlate with forgiveness. Forgiveness, in turn, was found to be linked to increased reconciliation and decreased revenge behaviors. The findings from this study highlight the importance of cultural factors in responses to relational transgressions, showing us that cultural norms and individual self-perceptions significantly influence forgiveness after relational transgressions. Each culture may have its own unique responses to forgiveness and transgressions.

=== Dimensions of forgiveness ===
The link between reconciliation and forgiveness involves exploring two dimensions of forgiveness: intrapsychic and interpersonal. The intrapsychic dimension relates to the cognitive processes and interpretations associated with a transgression (i.e. internal state), whereas interpersonal forgiveness is the interaction between relational partners. Total forgiveness is defined as including both the intrapsychic and interpersonal components which brings about a return to the conditions prior to the transgression. To only change one's internal state is silent forgiveness, and only having interpersonal interaction is considered hollow forgiveness.

However, some scholars contend that these two dimensions (intrapsychic and interpersonal) are independent as the complexities associated with forgiveness involve gradations of both dimensions. For example, a partner may not relinquish negative emotions yet choose to remain in the relationship because of other factors (e.g., children, financial concerns, etc.). Conversely, one may grant forgiveness and release all negative emotions directed toward their partner, while still exiting the relationship because the trust cannot be restored. Given this complexity, research has explored whether the transformation of negative emotions to positive emotions eliminates negative affect associated with a given offense. The conclusions drawn from this research suggest that no correlation exists between forgiveness and unforgiveness. Put simply, while forgiveness may be granted for a given transgression, the negative affect may not be reduced a corresponding amount.

=== Determinants of forgiveness ===
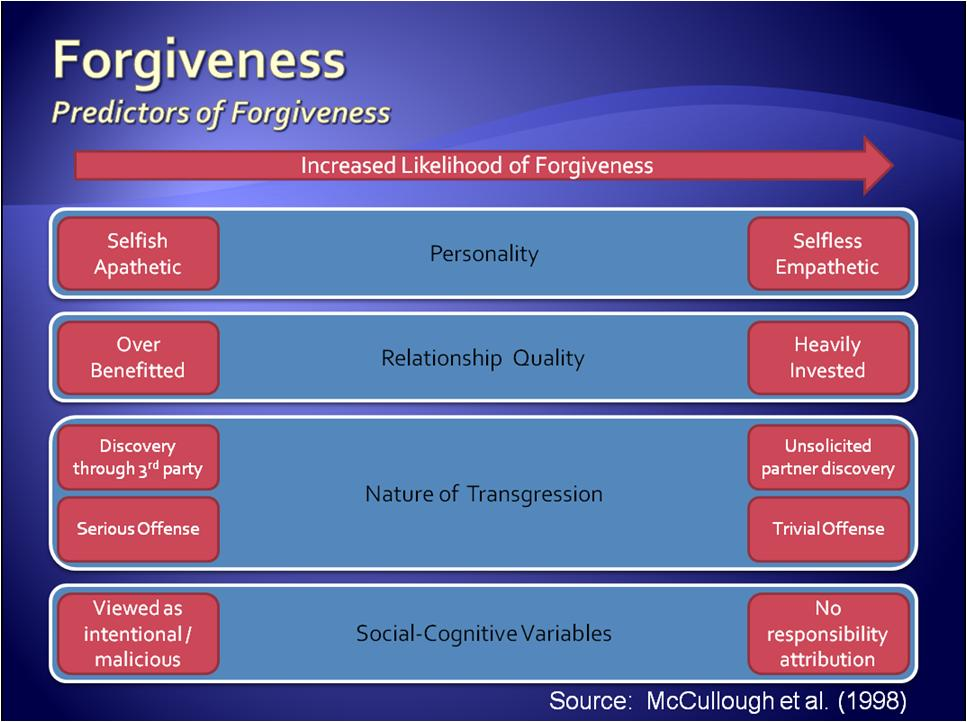
Predictors of forgiveness

McCullough et al. (1998) outlined predictors of forgiveness into four broad categories:

- Personality traits of both partners
- Relationship quality
- Nature of the transgression
- Social-cognitive variables

While personality variables and characteristics of the relationship are preexisting to the occurrence of forgiveness, nature of the offense and social-cognitive determinants become apparent at the time of the transgression.

==== Personality traits of both partners ====
Forgivingness is defined as one's general tendency to forgive transgressions. However, this tendency differs from forgiveness which is a response associated with a specific transgression. Listed below are characteristics of the forgiving personality as described by Emmons (2000).

- Does not seek revenge; effectively regulates negative affect
- Strong desire for a relationship free of conflict
- Shows empathy toward offender
- Does not personalize hurt associated with transgression

In terms of personality traits, agreeableness and neuroticism (i.e., instability, anxiousness, aggression) show consistency in predicting forgivingness and forgiveness. Since forgiveness requires one to discard any desire for revenge, a vengeful personality tends to not offer forgiveness and may continue to harbor feelings of vengeance long after the transgression occurred.

Research has shown that agreeableness is inversely correlated with motivations for revenge and avoidance, as well as positively correlated with benevolence. As such, one who demonstrates the personality trait of agreeableness is prone to forgiveness as well as has a general disposition of forgivingness. Conversely, neuroticism was positively correlated with avoidance and vengefulness, but negatively correlated with benevolence. Consequently, a neurotic personality is less apt to forgive or to have a disposition of forgivingness.

Though the personality traits of the offended have a predictive value of forgiveness, the personality of the offender also has an effect on whether forgiveness is offered. Offenders who show sincerity when seeking forgiveness and are persuasive in downplaying the impact of the transgression will have a positive effect on whether the offended will offer forgiveness.

Narcissistic personalities, for example, may be categorized as persuasive transgressors. This is driven by the narcissistic tendency to downplay transgressions, seeing themselves as perfect and seeking to save face at all costs. Such a dynamic suggests that personality determinants of forgiveness may involve not only the personality of the offended, but also that of the offender.

==== Relationship quality ====
The quality of a relationship between offended and offending partners can affect whether forgiveness is both sought and given. In essence, the more invested one is in a relationship, the more prone they are to minimize the hurt associated with transgressions and seek reconciliation.

McCullough et al. (1998) provides seven reasons behind why those in relationships will seek to forgive:

1. High investment in relationship (e.g., children, joint finances, etc.)
2. Views relationship as long term commitment
3. Have high degree of common interests
4. Is selfless in regard to their partner
5. Willingness to take viewpoint of partner (i.e. empathy)
6. Assumes motives of partner are in best interest of relationship (e.g., criticism is taken as constructive feedback)
7. Willingness to apologize for transgressions

Relationship maintenance activities are a critical component to maintaining high quality relationships. While being heavily invested tends to lead to forgiveness, one may be in a skewed relationship where the partner who is heavily invested is actually under benefitted. This leads to an over benefitted partner who is likely to take the relationship for granted and will not be as prone to exhibit relationship repair behaviors. As such, being mindful of the quality of a relationship will best position partners to address transgressions through a stronger willingness to forgive and seek to normalize the relationship.

Another relationship factor that affects forgiveness is history of past conflict. If past conflicts ended badly (i.e., reconciliation/forgiveness was either not achieved or achieved after much conflict), partners will be less prone to seek out or offer forgiveness. As noted earlier, maintaining a balanced relationship (i.e. no partner over/under benefitted) has a positive effect on relationship quality and tendency to forgive. In that same vein, partners are more likely to offer forgiveness if their partners had recently forgiven them for a transgression. However, if a transgression is repeated resentment begins to build which has an adverse effect on the offended partner's desire to offer forgiveness.

==== Nature of the transgression ====
The most notable feature of a transgression to have an effect on forgiveness is the seriousness of the offense. Some transgressions are perceived as being so serious that they are considered unforgivable. To counter the negative affect associated with a severe transgression, the offender may engage in repair strategies to lessen the perceived hurt of the transgression. The offender's communication immediately following a transgression has the greatest predictive value on whether forgiveness will be granted.

Consequently, offenders who immediately apologize, take responsibility and show remorse have the greatest chance of obtaining forgiveness from their partner. Further, self-disclosure of a transgression yields much greater results than if a partner is informed of the transgression through a third party. By taking responsibility for one's actions and being forthright through self-disclosure of an offense, partners may actually form closer bonds from the reconciliation associated with a serious transgression. As noted in the section on personality, repeated transgressions cause these relationship repair strategies to have a more muted effect as resentment begins to build and trust erodes.

==== Social-cognitive variables ====
Attributions of responsibility for a given transgression may have an adverse effect on forgiveness. Specifically, if a transgression is viewed as intentional or malicious, the offended partner is less likely to feel empathy and forgive. Based on the notion that forgiveness is driven primarily by empathy, the offender must accept responsibility and seek forgiveness immediately following the transgression, as apologies have shown to elicit empathy from the offended partner. The resulting feelings of empathy elicited in the offended partner may cause them to better relate to the guilt and loneliness their partner may feel as a result of the transgression. In this state of mind, the offended partner is more likely to seek to normalize the relationship through granting forgiveness and restoring closeness with their partner.

==== The role of third-party confidants ====
An article by Pederson et al. (2019) investigated the differences between the support that victims desire versus the support they actually receive when discussing relational transgressions with third-party confidants, like close friends. They found that individuals often receive less support than they desire, which can lead to further negative outcomes such as a decreased relational satisfaction and even increased stress.

Following relational transgressions, individuals often seek support from friends, family, or confidants to navigate their emotional responses and decisions regarding the relationship where the transgression had occurred. Discrepancies between the support desired and the support received, A.K.A. "support gaps" significantly impact a victim's coping from a transgression. The study found when individuals perceive a lack of adequate support, it can exacerbate feelings of distress and hinder the healing process from the relational transgression. On the other hand, appropriate and empathetic support from one's social network can help aid in the victim's coping process and contribute to more positive outcomes following a transgression. These findings show the important role that external, third-party support plays in the aftermath of relational transgressions and the importance of addressing support gaps to aid in the victim's recovery.

=== Remedial strategies for the offender ===
Prior sections offered definitions of forgiveness along with determinants of forgiveness from the perspective of the partner who has experienced the hurtful transgression. As noted earlier, swift apologies and utilization of repair strategies by the offender have the greatest likelihood of eliciting empathy from the offended and ultimately receiving forgiveness for the transgression. The sections below address remedial strategies offenders may use to facilitate a state in which the offended more likely to offer forgiveness and seek to normalize the relationship.

==== Apologies/concessions ====
Apologies represent the most common remedial strategy. An apology is the most straightforward means by which to admit responsibility, express regret, and seek forgiveness. Noted earlier, apologies are most effective if provided in a timely manner and involve a self-disclosure. Apologies occurring after discovery of a transgression by a third party are much less effective. Though apologies can range from a simple, “I’m sorry” to more elaborate forms, offenders are most successful when offering more complex apologies to match the seriousness of the transgression.

==== Excuses/justifications ====
Rather than accepting responsibility for a transgression through the form of an apology, a transgressor who explains why they engaged in a behavior is engaging in excuses or justifications. While excuses and justifications aim to minimize blame on the transgressor, the two address blame minimization from completely opposite perspectives. Excuses attempt to minimize blame by focusing on a transgressor's inability to control their actions (e.g., “How would I have known my ex-girlfriend was going to be at the party.”) or displace blame on a third party (e.g., “I went to lunch with my ex-girlfriend because I did not want to hurt her feelings.”) Conversely, a justification minimizes blame by suggesting that actions surrounding the transgression were justified or that the transgression was not severe. For example, a transgressor may justify having lunch with a past romantic interest, suggesting to their current partner that the lunch meeting was of no major consequence (e.g., “We are just friends.”)

==== Refusals ====
Refusals occur when a transgressor claims no blame for the perceived transgression. Refusals are different than apologies and excuses/justifications in that refusals do not include any blame acceptance. In the case of a refusal, the transgressor believes that they have not done anything wrong. Such a situation points out the complexity of relational transgressions. Perception of both partners must be taken into account when recognizing and addressing transgressions. For example, Bob and Sally have just started to date, but have not addressed whether they are mutually exclusive. When Bob finds out that Sally has been on a date with someone else, he confronts Sally. Sally may engage in refusal of blame because Bob and Sally had not explicitly noted whether they were mutually exclusive. The problem with these situations is that the transgressor shows no sensitivity to the offended. As such, the offended is less apt to exhibit empathy which is key towards forgiveness. As such, research has shown that refusals tend to aggravate situations, rather than serve as a meaningful repair strategy.

==== Appeasement/positivity ====
Appeasement involves the transgressor performing in actions that prevent a victim from being upset. Appeasement is used to offset hurtful behavior through the transgressor ingratiating themselves in ways such as promising never to commit the hurtful act or being overly kind to their partner. Appeasement may elicit greater empathy from the offended, through soothing strategies exhibited by the transgressor (e.g., complimenting, being more attentive, spending greater time together). However, the danger of appeasement is the risk that the actions of transgressor will be viewed as being artificial. For example, sending your partner flowers every day resulting from an infidelity you have committed, may be viewed as downplaying the severity of the transgression if the sending of flowers is not coupled with other soothing strategies that cause greater immediacy.

==== Avoidance/evasion ====
Avoidance involves the transgressor making conscious efforts to ignore the transgression (also referred to as “silence”). Avoidance can be effective after an apology is sought and forgiveness is granted (i.e., minimizing discussion around unpleasant subjects once closure has been obtained). However, total avoidance of a transgression where the hurt of the offended is not recognized and forgiveness is not granted can result in further problems in the future. As relational transgressions tend to develop the nature of the relationship through drawing of new rules/boundaries, avoidance of a transgression does not allow for this development. Not surprisingly, avoidance is ineffective as a repair strategy, particularly for instances in which infidelity has occurred.

==== Relationship talk ====
Relationship talk is a remediation strategy that focuses on discussing the transgression in the context of the relationship. Aune et al. (1998) identified two types of relationship talk, relationship invocation and metatalk. Relationship invocation involves using the relationship as a backdrop for a discussion of the transgression. For example, “We are too committed to this relationship to let it fail.”, or “Our relationship is so much better than any of my previous relationships.” Metatalk involves discussing the effect of the transgression on the relationship. For example, infidelity may cause partners to redefine rules of the relationship and reexamine the expectations of commitment each partner expects from the other.

==== Communication directness after transgressions ====
A couple's communication directness after transgressions may have a direct impact on conflict management. A study conducted by Theiss and Solomon (2006) highlighted the importance of direct communication in addressing relational irritations. Findings from this study help to inform readers about effective strategies for managing conflict before they escalate into significant transgressions.

This study looked into how important factors such as intimacy, uncertainty about one's romantic relationship, and a partner's interference impact how directly couples communicate about their annoyances or transgressions. The results found that higher intimacy and personal uncertainty can lead to more direct communication, while uncertainty about the relationship leads to less directness between the couple. This highlights how communication patterns between partners and communicative directness can influence the experience and resolution of relational transgressions in romantic relationships.

== See also ==
- Affect display
- Cognitive distortion
- Expectancy Violations Theory
- Forgiveness

== General and cited references ==
- Ashton, M.C., Paunonen, S.V., Helmes, E., & Jackson, D.N. (1998). Kin altruism, reciprocal altruism, and the Big Five personality factors. Evolution and Human Behavior, 19, 243-255.
- Aune, R.K., Metts, S., & Hubbard, A.S.E. (1998). Managing the outcomes of discovered deception. Journal of Social Psychology, 138, 677-689.
- Bachman, G.F., & Guerrero, L.K. (2006). Forgiveness, apology, and communicative responses to hurtful events. Communication Reports, 19, 45-56.
- Barr-Zisowitz, C. (2000). “Sadness” – Is there such a thing? In M. Lewis & J.M. Haviland-Jones (Eds.), Handbook of emotions (2nd ed., pp 607–622). New York: Guilford.
- Baumeister, R.F., Exline, J.J., & Sommer, K.L. (1998). The victim role, grudge theory, and two dimensions of forgiveness. In E.L. Worthington (Ed.), Dimensions of forgiveness: Psychological research and theological perspectives (pp. 79–104). Philadelphia: Templeton Foundation Press.
- Berry, J.W., & Worthington, E.L., Jr. (2001). Forgivingness, relationship quality, stress while imagining relationship events, and physical and mental health. Journal of Counseling Psychology, 48, 447-455.
- Berry, J.W., Worthington, E.L, Jr., O’Connor, L.E., Parrott, L., III, & Wade, N.G. (2005). Forgiveness, vengeful rumination, and affective traits. Journal of Personality, 73, 183-229.
- Boon, S.D., & Sulsky, L.M. (1997). Attributions of blame and forgiveness in romantic relationships: A policy capturing study. Journal of Social Behavior and Personality, 12, 19-44.
- Buller, D.B., & Burgoon, J.K. (1996). Interpersonal Deception Theory. Communication Theory, 6, 203-242.
- Burgoon, J.K., Blair, J.P., & Strom, R.E. (2008). Cognitive biases and nonverbal cue availability in detecting deception. Human Communication Research, 34, 572-599.
- Burgoon, J.K., & Qin, T. (2006). The dynamic nature of deceptive verbal communication. Journal of Language and Social Psychology, 25, 76-96.
- Cameron, J.J., Ross, M., & Holmes, J.G. (2002). Loving the one you hurt: Positive effects of recounting a transgression against an intimate partner. Journal of Experimental Social Psychology, 38, 307-314.
- Cann, A., & Baucom, T.R. (2004). Former partners and new rivals as threats to a relationship: Infidelity type, gender, and commitment as factors related to distress and forgiveness. Personal Relationships, 11, 305-318.
- Carson, C.L., & Cupach, W.R. (2000). Fueling the flames of the green-eyed monster: The role of ruminative thought in reaction to romantic jealousy. Western Journal of Communication, 64, 308-329.
- Darby, B.W., & Schlenker, B.R. (1982). Children's reactions to apologies. Journal of Personality and Social Psychology, 43, 743-753.
- Darby, B.W., & Schlenker, B.R. (1989). Children's reactions to transgressions: Effects of the actor's apology, reputation, and remorse. British Journal of Social Psychology, 28, 353-364.
- Docan-Morgan, T., & Docan, C.A. (2007). Internet infidelity: Double standards and the differing views of women and men. Communication Quarterly, 55, 317-342.
- Emmons, R.A. (2000). Personality and forgiveness. In M.E. McCullough, K.I. Pargament, & C.E. Thoresen (Eds.), Forgiveness: Theory, research, and practice (pp. 156–175). New York: Guilford.
- Exline, J.J., Baumeister, R.F., Bushman, B.J., Campbell, W.K., & Finkel, E.J. (2004). Too proud to let go: Narcissistic entitlement as a barrier to forgiveness. Journal of Personality and Social Psychology, 87, 894-912.
- Fincham, F.D. (2000). The kiss of the porcupines: From attributing responsibility to forgiving, Personal Relationships, 7, 1-23.
- Fincham, F.D., Paleari, F.G., & Regalia, C. (2002). Forgiveness in marriage: The role of relationship quality, attributions, and empathy. Personal Relationships, 9, 27-37.
- Fine, M.A., & Olson, K.A. (1997). Anger and hurt in response to provocation: Relationship to psychological adjustment. Journal of Social Behavior and Personality, 12, 325-344.
- Fleischmann, A.A., Spitzberg, B.H., Andersen, P.A., & Roesch, S.C. (2005). Tickling the monster: Jealousy induction in relationships. Journal of Social and Personal Relationships, 22, 49-73.
- Guerrero, L., Anderson, P., Afifi, W. (2007). Close Encounters: Communication in Relationships (2nd ed.). Los Angeles: Sage Publications.
- Guerrero, L.K., Andersen, P.A., Jorgensen, P.F., Spitzberg, B.H., & Eloy, S.V. (1995). Coping with the green-eyed monster: Conceptualizing and measuring communicative responses to romantic jealousy. Western Journal of Communication, 59, 270-304.
- Hoyt, W.T., McCullough, M.E., Fincham, F.D., Maio, G., & Davila, J. (2005). Responses to interpersonal transgressions in families: Forgivingness, forgivability, and relationship-specific events. Journal of Personality and Social Psychology, 89, 375-394.
- Izard, C.E., & Ackerman, B.P. (2000). Motivational, organizational, and regulatory functions of discrete emotions. In M. Lewis & J.M. Haviland-Jones (Eds.), Handbook of emotions (2nd ed., pp. 253–264). New York: Guilford.
- Kelly, D.L. (1998). The communication of forgiveness. Communication Studies, 49, 1-17.
- Konstam, V., Holmes, W., & Levine, B. (2003). Empathy, selfism, and coping as elements of the psychology of forgiveness: A preliminary study. Counseling and Values, 47, 172-183.
- Leary, M.R., Springer, C., Negel, L., Ansell, E., & Evans, K. (1998). The causes, phenomenology, and consequences of hurt feelings. Journal of Personality and Social Psychology, 74, 1225-1237.
- Levine, T.R., McCornack. S.A., & Avery, P.B. (1992). Sex differences in emotional reactions to discovered deception. Communication Quarterly, 40, 289-296.
- McCullough, M.E., Bellah, C.G., Kilpatrick, S.D., & Johnson, J.L. (2001). Vengefulness: Relationships with forgiveness, rumination, well-being, and the Big Five. Personality and Social Psychology Bulletin, 27, 601-610.
- McCullough, M.E., Rachal, K.C., Sandage, S.J., Worthington, E.L., Jr., Brown, S.W., & Hight, T.L. (1998). Interpersonal forgiving in close relationships: II. Theoretical elaboration and measurement. Journal of Personality and Social Psychology, 75, 1586-1603.
- McCullough, M.E., Worthington, E.L, Jr., & Rachal, K.C. (1997). Interpersonal forgiving in close relationships. Journal of Personality and Social Psychology, 73, 321-336.
- Metts, S., & Cupach, W. (2007). Responses to Relational Transgressions: Hurt, Anger, and Sometimes Forgiveness. In B. Spitzberg & W. Cupach (Eds.), The Dark Side of Interpersonal Communication (pp. 243–274). New York: Routledge.
- Metts, S., Morse, C. & Lamb, E. (2001, November). The influence of relational history on the management and outcomes of relational transgressions. Paper presented at the convention of the National Communication Association. Atlanta, GA.
- Millar, M., & Millar, K. (1995). Detection of deception in familiar and unfamiliar persons: The effects of information restriction. Journal of Nonverbal Behavior, 19, 69-83.
- Mongeau, P.A., Hale, J.L., & Alles, M. (1994). An experimental investigation of accounts and attributions following sexual infidelity. Communication Monographs, 61, 326-344.
- Roberts, R.C. (1995). "Forgivingness". American Philosophical Quarterly, 32, 289-306.
- Rozin, P, Haidt, J., & McCauley, C.R. (2000). Disgust. In M. Lewis & J.M. Haviland-Jones (Eds.), Handbook of emotions (2nd ed. pp. 607–622). New York: Guilford.
- Shackelford, T.K., Buss, D.M., & Bennett, K. (2002). Forgiveness or breakup: Sex differences in responses to a partner's infidelity. Cognition and Emotion, 16, 299-307.
- Thompson, L.Y., Snyder, C.R., Hoffman, L., Michael, S.T. Rasmussen, H.N., Billings, L.S., et al. (2005). Dispositional forgiveness of self, others, and situations. Journal of Personality, 73, 313-359.
- Vrij, A. (2008). Detecting lies and deceit: Pitfalls and opportunities. West Sussex, England: John Wiley & Sons, Ltd.
- Wade, N.G. & Worthington, E.L. (2003). Overcoming interpersonal offenses: Is forgiveness the only way to deal with unforgiveness? Journal of Counseling and Development, 81, 343-353.
- Witvleit, C., Ludwig, T.E., & Vander Lann, K. (2001). Granting forgiveness or harboring grudges: Implications for emotion, physiology, and health. Psychological Science, 11, 117-123.
- Wolf-Smith, J.H., & LaRossa, R. (1992). After he hits her. Family Relations, 41, 324-329.
- Worthington, E.L. Jr. (1998). The pyramid model of forgiveness: Some interdisciplinary speculations about unforgiveness and the promotion of forgiveness. In E.L. Worthington, Jr. (Ed.), Dimensions of forgiveness: Psychological research and theological perspectives (pp. 107–138). Philadelphia: Templeton Foundation Press.
- Young, S.L. (2004). Factors that influence recipients' appraisals of hurtful communication. Journal of Social and Personal Relationships, 21, 291-303.
- Younger, J.W., Piferi, R.L., Jobe, R.L., & Lawler, K.A. (2004). Dimensions of forgiveness: The views of laypersons. Journal of Social and Personal Relationships, 21, 837-855.
