= Excusatio non petita, accusatio manifesta =

Medieval Latin phrase

Excusatio non petita, accusatio manifesta is a Latin phrase of medieval origin. Its literal translation is "Unsolicited excuse, manifest accusation" (or "He who excuses himself, accuses himself").

The meaning of this phrase is: if one has nothing to justify themselves for, they should not apologize at all. Struggling to justify one's own actions without being solicited can be considered as an indication that one has something to hide, even if the person is in fact innocent.

A similar phrase can be found in the Letters of St. Jerome, as he warned: "dum excusare credis, accusas" ("while you think you are excusing yourself, you are accusing [yourself]").

In Canada, the Apology Act, 2009 provides that this principle does not necessarily imply legal guilt.
