= Apology Act, 2009 =

Law in Ontario, Canada

Legislative Assembly of Ontario
- Long title: An Act respecting apologies
- Citation: S.O. 2009, c. 3
- Royal assent: 23 April 2009

Legislative history
- Bill citation: Bill 108
- Introduced by: Chris Bentley MPP, Attorney General
- First reading: October 7, 2008
- Second reading: October 23, 2008
- Third reading: March 11, 2009
- Status: Current legislation

The Apology Act, 2009 (Bill 108; French: Loi concernant la présentation d’excuses) is a law in the province of Ontario that provides that an apology made by a person does not necessarily constitute an admission of guilt.

The law contains several exceptions, including apologies made while testifying at a civil proceeding and to allow some apologies to be used as admission of guilt under the Provincial Offences Act.

The law has attracted a level of popular commentary, often focused on the stereotype of Canadian usage of the word "sorry", even though most American states have similar laws. Several other Canadian provinces, such as British Columbia, Saskatchewan, and Manitoba have similar laws in place.

== Legislative history ==
The bill was originally introduced in April 2008 as a private member's bill by David Orazietti, Liberal backbench MPP for Sault Ste. Marie. The bill was re-introduced in October that year by Attorney General Chris Bentley, stating that "we see fewer and fewer acknowledgments, demonstrations of regret, demonstrations of remorse, until the lawsuit."

The passage of the bill was supported by the Progressive Conservative Party of Ontario, despite some original opposition from critic Christine Elliott, but opposed by the Ontario NDP.

The law received support from the Ontario Hospital Association, the Registered Nurses Association of Ontario, and the Ontario Medical Association, as well as the Ontario Bar Association.

== See also ==
- Excusatio non petita, accusatio manifesta
