= Integrative communication theory =

Theory of cross-cultural adaptation

Integrative communication theory is a theory of cross-cultural adaptation proposed by Young Yun Kim. The first widely published version of Kim's theory is found in the last three chapters of a textbook authored by William Gudykunst with Young Yun Kim as second author. See acculturation and assimilation.

== Background of integrative communication theory ==
Young Yun Kim's assimilation Theory of Cross-Cultural Adaptation maintains that human transformation takes only one path, assimilative. Kim argues that all human beings experience conformity as they move into a new and culturally unfamiliar environment and that they do so by "unlearning" who they were originally. The concept, cross-cultural adaptation, refers to a process in and through which an individual achieves an increasing level of psychological and functional fitness with respect to the receiving environment. Kim's theory postulates a zero-sum process whereby assimilation or "adaptation" occurs only to the extent that the newcomer lose the characteristics of their original cultural identity, such as language, customs, beliefs and values.

Kim's theory however is self-contradictory for on one hand Kim argues that the newcomer "evolves" toward becoming exactly like the host majority by internalizing the majority's ways of thinking, feeling and behaving while unlearning their own. But on the other hand Kim argues that out of this transformation emerges an intercultural identity, that somehow exists beyond all the contingencies of culture and language itself. Kim claims that individuals that enter a new culture for varying lengths of time, and to include migrant workers, diplomats, and expatriates alike

=== Investigative efforts ===
Kim's research into cross-cultural adaptation started in the 1970s within a survey of Korean immigrants in the Chicago, Illinois area. It finally expanded to study other immigrant and refugee groups in the United States to include American Indians, Japanese and Mexican Americans, and Southeast Asian refugees. In addition to studying groups of immigrants, Young Yun Kim researched groups of students studying abroad in the United States, as well as international students in Japan, Korean expatriates in the United States and American expatriates in South Korea. The first outline of her theory was found in an article titled, "Toward an Interactive Theory of Communication - Acculturation", leading to a complete rendition of the theory in Communication and Cross-Cultural Adaptation: An Integrative Theory, which was further refined and updated with Becoming Intercultural: An Integrative Theory of Communication and Cross-Cultural Adaptation.

Kim states that there are five key "missing links" in cross-cultural adaptation literature, which her theory attempts to cover:

1. Lack of attention to macro-level factors, such as the cultural and institutional patterns of the host environment
2. Need to integrate the traditionally separate areas of investigation of long-term and short-term adaptation
3. Cross cultural adaptation must be viewed in the context of new learning and psychological growth to provide a more balanced and complete interpretation of the experiences of individuals in an unfamiliar environment
4. Efforts must be made to sort and consolidate the factors constituting and/or explaining the cross-cultural adaptation process of individuals
5. Divergent ideological premises of assimilationalism and pluralism need to be recognized and incorporated into a pragmatic conception of cross-cultural adaptation as a condition of the host environment as well as of the individual adapting to that environment.

=== Organizing principles ===
- Adaptation as a Natural and Universal Phenomenon
  - The theory of integrative communication rests on the human instinct to struggle for equilibrium when met with adversarial environmental conditions as experienced in a new culture. This experience is not limited to any one region, cultural group, or nation, but is a universal concept of the basic human tendencies that accompany the struggle on each individual when they are faced with a new and challenging environment.
- Adaptation as an All-Encompassing Phenomenon
  - Before efforts at racial and cultural integration in the United States, the main thrust was assimilation. The stress was on the ideology of the "model minority" which states that the only standard for "appropriate," "effective," and "competent" thinking (cognition), feeling (affect), and behavior (functional fit) was a presumed majority mainstream culture. The immigrant newcomer was compelled to internalize mainstream ways of thinking, feeling, and behaving or be marginalized. Beginning even before World War II and certainly after, efforts at racial and ethnic integration grew dramatically and the model minority ideology became untenable (Kramer, 2003). But even into the twenty-first century we see remnants of it. An example is Young Yun Kim's cross-cultural adaptation theory. The theory focuses on the unitary nature of psychological and social processes and the reciprocal functional personal environment interdependence. This view takes into account micro-psychological and macro-social factors into a theoretical fusion "vertical integration" of theory. While cross-cultural adaptation theory itself is a fusion of previous ideas, it is not about racial or ethnic integration but instead assimilation. And as such it is unlike the works of Bateson, Ruesch and Bateson, Watzlawick Beavin, and Jackson, and Buss and Kenrick Kim's approach is unilinear. The sojourner must conform to the majority group culture in order to be "communicatively competent." Evolutionary progress for the individual requires the individual to "abandon identification with the cultural patterns that have constituted who one is and what one is" (p. 377). These patterns are not just behavioral but "appropriate" ways of thinking as defined by the majority mainstream reality. In contradistinction from Gudykunst and Kim's version of adaptive evolution, Eric M. Kramer, in his theory of Cultural Fusion (2011, 2010, 2000a, 1997a, 2000a, 2011, 2012) maintains clear conceptual separation between assimilation, adaptation, and integration. Only assimilation involves conformity to a pre-existing form. Kramer's (2000a, 2000b, 2000c, 2003, 2009, 2011) theory of Cultural Fusion, which is based on systems theory and hermeneutics, argues that first it is impossible for a person to unlearn themselves and second that "growth" is, by definition, not a zero sum process that requires the disillusion of one form for another to come into being but rather a process of learning new languages and cultural repertoires (ways of thinking, cooking, playing, working worshipping, and so forth). One need not unlearn a language in order to learn a new one. Cognitive complexity involves the ability to code switch between repertoires, not a zero growth, zero-sum process as Gudykunst and Kim claim (2003, p 383). Learning is growth, not unlearning.
- Adaptation as a Communication-Based Phenomenon
  - A person begins to adapt only as they communicate with others in their new environment. Integration relies on that interaction with the host society and the degree to which an individual adapts depends on the amount and nature of communication with members of the host society.
- Theory as a System of Description and Explanation
  - The present theory is designed to identify the patterns that are commonly present within a clearly defined set of individual cases and to translate these patterns into a set of generalized and interrelated statements. The fact that humans will adapt in a new environment was not questioned, but rather how and why individuals adapt.
- Theorizing at the Interface of Deduction and Induction
  - Kim's research has switched between deductive and inductive processes – between the conceptual realm of logical development of ideas from a set of basic assumptions about human adaptation and empirical substantiation of the ideas based on proofs available in social science literature. In her research, Kim introduced anecdotal stories and testimonials of immigrants and sojourners available in non-technical sources such as reports, biographies, letters, diaries, dialogues, commentaries, and other materials in magazines, newspapers, fiction and nonfiction books, radio programs, and televisions programs. These individual accounts are not scientific data, but rather serve as a vital source of insights into the "lived experiences" of cross cultural adaptation.
- Focal Concepts and Boundary Conditions
  - Kim employs two central terms in Integrative Communication Theory, adaptation and stranger, in order to help define the theory. Stranger incorporates in it all individuals who enter and resettle in a new cultural or sub-cultural environment.

== Process of cross-cultural adaptation ==
All human beings are born into an unfamiliar environment and are brought up to become part of a culture. This process is known as enculturation, and refers to the organization, integration, and maintenance of a home environment throughout the formative years along with the internal change that occurs with increasing interaction of the individual in its cultural environment.

=== Entering a new culture ===
The transition into a new culture can be shocking, and internal conflicts often arise. The individual must learn to adapt and grow into the new environment, as they are often faced with situations that challenge their cultural norms and worldview. This is the process known as acculturation as described by Shibutani and Kwan in 1965. According to Kim, as new learning occurs, deculturation or unlearning of some of the old cultural elements has to occur, at least in the sense that new responses are adopted in situations that previously would have evoked old ones. The individual is forced to develop new habits, which may come in conflict with the old ones. Kim states that the ultimate theoretical directionality of adaptive change is toward assimilation, a state of the maximum possible convergence of strangers' internal and external conditions to those of the natives. Assimilation is an ongoing process and is not usually fully attained, regardless of the amount of time spent in the new culture.

Integrative communication theory suggests that these varying levels of integration within a culture directly impact the individual's experience in the new culture, which other research suggests. According to Don C. Locke, one major difference among members of various cultural groups within America is the degree to which they have immersed themselves into the culture of the United States. He states that members of culturally diverse groups can be placed into several categories. Bicultural individuals are able to function as competently in the dominant culture as their own while holding on to manifestations of their own culture. Traditional individuals hold on to a majority of cultural traits from the culture of origin and reject many traits of the dominant culture. A third type of individual will acculturate and give up most cultural traits of the culture of origin and traits of the dominant culture. Finally, a marginal individual does not fit into the culture of origin nor into the dominant culture.

=== The stress-adaptation-growth dynamic ===
Kim has developed an integrative communication theory of cross-cultural adaptation which conceives adaptation as a dialectic process of the "stress-adaptation-growth" dynamic that gradually leads to greater functional fitness and psychological health with regards to the host environment. This portion of Kim's theory focuses on the stress that inevitably accompanies a cross-cultural move, as the individual strives to retain aspects of their old culture while also attempting to integrate into the new one. The internal conflict that arises results in a state of disequilibrium of emotional "lows" of uncertainty confusion, and anxiety. People handle this change in various ways, to include avoidance, denial, and withdrawal, as well as regression into pre-existing habits in order to eliminate discomfort in the new environment. Others develop new habits and begin the process of adaptation, allowing them to become better suited to their environment. Once this occurs, a period of growth often accompanies. The stress adaptation growth dynamic, therefore, is not a linear process but a back and forth endeavor that will entail periods of regression and subsequent progression. Assimilation can be defined as the process by which a person takes material into their mind from the environment, which may mean changing the evidence of their senses to make it fit, whereas accommodation is the difference made to one's mind or concepts by the process of assimilation.

== The structure of cross-cultural adaptation ==
=== Personal communication: host communication competence ===
Communication is a prerequisite for successful adaptation of individuals into a new environment. This relies on decoding, or the capacity of strangers to receive and process information, as well as encoding, or the designing and executing mental plans in initiating or responding to messages. There are three commonly recognized categories:

1. Cognitive: Includes such internal capabilities as the knowledge of the host culture and language, history, institutions, worldviews, beliefs, norms, and rules of interpersonal conduct.
2. Affective: Affective competence facilitates cross-cultural adaptation by providing a motivational capacity to deal with various challenges of living in the host environment, the openness to new learning, and the willingness to participate in emotional and physical aspects of the host environment.
3. Operational: Operational competence relates to the other aspects of host communication competence and facilitates strangers' outwardly expressing their cognitive and affective experiences.

=== Host social communication ===
Participation in the interpersonal and mass communication activities of the host society is crucial. Host interpersonal communication helps strangers to secure vital information and insight into the mind-sets and behaviors of the local people, thereby providing strangers a reference point for their own behaviors, while host mass communication relies on integrating the individual into the host society via media, radio, television, etc...and serves as an important source of cultural and language learning without relying heavily on individual participation and exposure.

=== Ethnic social communication ===
In the initial phase of integration, ethnic communities serve to allow strangers to receive some of the comforts of their previous culture, and serve to facilitate adaptation. After the initial phase, ethnic social communication allows individuals to maintain connectedness to their original culture.

=== Environment ===
Some cultures make it easier to assimilate than others, and the host environment has a direct impact on the nature of an individual's integration. Some societies display more openness and warmth to outsiders than others. The degree to which a given host environment exerts receptivity and conformity pressure on a stranger is closely influenced by the overall ethnic group strength, which is a measure of a given stranger's ethnic group's capacity to influence the surrounding host environment at large.

=== Predisposition ===
An individual can better prepare themselves to enter a new environment, both physically and emotionally, which will have a positive effect on their ability to transition. This takes into account the mental, emotional, and motivational readiness to deal with the new environment, including understanding of the new language and culture. Having an open mind helps to alleviate some of the culture shock that is associated with assimilation into the new environment.

== See also ==
- Acculturation
- Enculturation
- Intercultural communication principles
